The Srebrenica massacre, also known as the Srebrenica genocide, was the July 1995 genocidal killing of more than 8,000 Bosniak Muslim men and boys in and around the town of Srebrenica, during the Bosnian War.

The killings were perpetrated by units of the Bosnian Serb Army of Republika Srpska (VRS) under the command of Ratko Mladić. The Scorpions, a paramilitary unit from Serbia, who had been part of the Serbian Interior Ministry until 1991, also participated in the massacre. Prior to the massacre, United Nations (UN) had declared the besieged enclave of Srebrenica, in eastern Bosnia, a "safe area" under UN protection. However, the UN failed both to demilitarize the Army of the Republic of Bosnia and Herzegovina (ARBiH) within Srebrenica and to force withdrawal of the VRS surrounding Srebrenica. UNPROFOR's 370 lightly armed Dutchbat soldiers were unable to prevent the town's capture and the subsequent massacre. A list of missing or killed people during the massacre compiled by the Bosnian Federal Commission of Missing Persons contains 8,372 names.

Some Serbs have claimed that the massacre was retaliation for civilian casualties inflicted on Serbs by Bosniak soldiers from Srebrenica under command of Naser Orić. These 'revenge' claims have been rejected and condemned by the ICTY and UN as bad faith attempts to justify the genocide.

In 2004, in a unanimous ruling on the case of Prosecutor v. Krstić, the Appeals Chamber of the International Criminal Tribunal for the former Yugoslavia (ICTY), located in The Hague, ruled that the massacre of the enclave's male inhabitants constituted genocide, a crime under international law. The ruling was also upheld by the International Court of Justice (ICJ) in 2007. The forcible transfer and abuse of between 25,000 and 30,000 Bosniak Muslim women, children and elderly which accompanied the massacre was found to constitute genocide, when accompanied with the killings and separation of the men.

In 2013, 2014, and again in 2019, the Dutch state was found liable in the Dutch supreme court and in the Hague district court of failing to do enough to prevent more than 300 of the deaths.

In April 2013, Serbian President Tomislav Nikolić apologised for "the crime" of Srebrenica, but refused to call it genocide.

Background

Conflict in eastern Bosnia and Herzegovina 

The multiethnic Socialist Republic of Bosnia and Herzegovina was mainly inhabited by Muslim Bosniaks (44 percent), Orthodox Serbs (31 percent) and Catholic Croats (17 percent). As the former Yugoslavia began to disintegrate, the region declared national sovereignty on 15 October 1991, and held a referendum for independence on 29 February 1992. The result of that referendum, which favours independence, was opposed by the political representatives of the Bosnian Serbs who had boycotted the referendum. The Republic of Bosnia and Herzegovina was formally recognised by the European Community on 6 April 1992 and the United Nations on 22 May 1992.

Following the declaration of independence, Bosnian Serb forces, supported by the Serbian government of Slobodan Milošević and the Yugoslav People's Army (JNA), attacked the Republic of Bosnia and Herzegovina in order to secure and unify the territory under Serb control, and to create an ethnically Serb state of Republica Srpska. In the subsequent struggle for territorial control, the non-Serb populations from areas under Serbian control, especially the Bosniak population in Eastern Bosnia, near the Serbian borders, were subject to ethnic cleansing.

1992: Beginning of ethnic cleansing campaign 

Srebrenica, and the surrounding Central Podrinje region, had immense strategic importance to the Bosnian Serb leadership, as it was the bridge to two disconnected parts of the envisioned ethnic state of Republika Srpska. The capture and ethnic purification of Srebrenica would also undermine the viability of the Bosnian Muslim state.

In 1991, 73% of the population in Srebrenica were Bosnian Muslims and 25% were Bosnian Serb. Tensions between the Bosnian Muslim and the Bosnian Serb in Srebrenica intensified in the early 1990s, as the local Bosnian Serb population began to be provided with weapons and military equipment distributed by the Serb paramilitary groups, the Yugoslav People's Army (the "JNA") and Serb Democratic Party (the "SDS").

By April 1992, Srebrenica had become increasingly isolated by the Serb forces. On 17 April 1992, the Bosnian Muslim population of Srebrenica was given a 24-hour ultimatum to surrender all weapons and leave town. In April 1992, Srebrenica was briefly captured by the Bosnian Serbs, and then was retaken by Bosnian Muslims on 8 May 1992. Nonetheless, the Bosnian Muslims remained surrounded by Serb forces, and was cut off from outlying areas. Between April 1992 and March 1993, the Naser Orić trial judgment described the situation in Srebrenica as follows:

During the first three months of war, from April to June 1992, the Bosnian Serb forces, with support from the JNA, destroyed 296 predominantly Bosniak villages in the region around Srebrenica, forcibly uprooted some 70,000 Bosniaks from their homes and systematically massacred at least 3,166 Bosniaks (documented deaths) including many women, children and elderly.

In neighbouring Bratunac, Bosniaks were either killed or forced to flee to Srebrenica, resulting in 1,156 deaths. Thousands of Bosniaks were also killed in Foča, Zvornik, Cerska and Snagovo.

Struggle for Srebrenica 1992–1993 
Serb military and paramilitary forces from the area and neighbouring parts of eastern Bosnia and Herzegovina and Serbia gained control of Srebrenica for several weeks in early 1992, killing and expelling Bosniak civilians. In May 1992, Bosnian government forces under the leadership of Orić recaptured the town.

Over the remainder of 1992, offensives by Bosnian government forces from Srebrenica increased the area under their control, and by January 1993 they had linked with Bosniak-held Žepa to the south and Cerska to the west. During this time, Army of the Republic of Bosnia and Herzegovina (ARBiH) forces under the command of Naser Orić used Srebrenica as a staging ground to attack neighboring Serb villages  inflicting many casualties. On one occasion in 1993, the village of Kravica was attacked by ARBIH and resulted in numerous Serb civilian casualties. The actions carried out by the ARBIH under the command of Naser Orić were seen as a catalyst for what occurred in Srebrenica in 1995. According to General Philippe Morillon's testimony at the session of the ICTY 12 February 2004:
 
Over the next few months, the Serb military captured the villages of Konjević Polje and Cerska, severing the link between Srebrenica and Žepa and reducing the size of the Srebrenica enclave to 150 square kilometres. Bosniak residents of the outlying areas converged on the town of Srebrenica and its population swelled to between 50,000 and 60,000 people, which was about ten times Srebrenica's pre-war population.

General Philippe Morillon of France, Commander of the United Nations Protection Force (UNPROFOR), visited Srebrenica in March 1993. By then, the town was overcrowded and siege conditions prevailed. There was almost no running water as the advancing Serb forces had destroyed the town's water supplies; people relied on makeshift generators for electricity. Food, medicine and other essentials were extremely scarce. The conditions rendered Srebrenica a slow death camp. Before leaving, General Morillon told the panicked residents of Srebrenica at a public gathering that the town was under the protection of the UN and that he would never abandon them.

During March and April 1993 several thousand Bosniaks were evacuated from Srebrenica under the auspices of the UN High Commissioner for Refugees (UNHCR). The evacuations were opposed by the Bosnian government in Sarajevo as contributing to the ethnic cleansing of predominantly Bosniak territory.

The Serb authorities remained intent on capturing the enclave. On 13 April 1993, the Serbs told the UNHCR representatives that they would attack the town within two days unless the Bosniaks surrendered and agreed to be evacuated.

Starvation in Srebrenica 1992–1995
With the failure to demilitarize and lack of supplies getting into the city, Naser Orić consolidated his power and controlled the black market. Orić's men began hoarding food, fuel, cigarettes and embezzled money sent by foreign aid agencies to support Muslim orphans. Basic necessities were out of reach for many of the people in Srebrenica due to Orić's actions. UN officials were beginning to lose patience with the ARBiH in Srebrenica and saw them as "criminal gang leaders, pimps and black marketeers".

A former Serb soldier of the "Red Berets" unit described the tactics used to starve and kill the besieged population of Srebrenica:

When British journalist Tony Birtley visited the besieged Srebrenica in March 1993, he took footage of Bosniak civilians starving to death.

The judgment of the Hague Tribunal in the case of Naser Orić found that:

Organisation of UNPROFOR and UNPF

In April 1995, UNPROFOR became the name used for the Bosnia and Herzegovina regional command of the now-renamed United Nations Peace Forces (UNPF). The 2011 report Srebrenica: a 'safe' area says that "On 12 June 1995 a new command was created under UNPF", with "12,500 British, French and Dutch troops equipped with tanks and high calibre artillery in order to increase the effectiveness and the credibility of the peacekeeping operation". The report states:

Srebrenica "safe area"

April 1993: the Security Council declares Srebrenica a "safe area" 

On 16 April 1993, the United Nations Security Council passed Resolution 819, which demanded that "all parties and others concerned treat Srebrenica and its surroundings as a safe area which should be free from any armed attack or any other hostile act".

On 18 April 1993, the first group of United Nations Protection Force ("UNPROFOR") troops arrived in Srebrenica. The UNPROFOR deployed Canadian troops to protect Srebrenica as one of the five newly established UN "safe areas". UNPROFOR presence prevented all-out assault on the safe area, although occasional skirmishes and mortar attacks continued.

On 8 May 1993 agreement was reached for demilitarization of Srebrenica. According to UN reports, "General [Sefer] Halilović and General [Ratko] Mladić agreed on measures covering the whole of the Srebrenica enclave and the adjacent enclave of Žepa. Under the terms of the new agreement, Bosniak forces within the enclave would hand over their weapons, ammunition and mines to UNPROFOR, after which Serb "heavy weapons and units that constituted a menace to the demilitarised zones which will have been established in Žepa and Srebrenica will be withdrawn." Unlike the earlier agreement, the agreement of 8 May stated specifically that Srebrenica was to be considered a "demilitarised zone", as referred to in article 60 of the Protocol Additional to the Geneva Conventions of 12 August 1949, and relating to the Protection of Victims of International Armed Conflicts (Protocol I)."

From the outset, both parties to the conflict violated the "safe area" agreement, although a two year period of relative stability followed the establishment of the enclave. Lieutenant colonel Thom Karremans (the Dutchbat Commander) testified to the ICTY that his personnel were prevented from returning to the enclave by Serb forces and that equipment and ammunition were also prevented from getting in. Bosniaks in Srebrenica complained of attacks by Serb soldiers, while to the Serbs it appeared that Bosnian government forces in Srebrenica were using the "safe area" as a convenient base from which to launch counter-offensives against the Army of the Republika Srpska (VRS) and that UNPROFOR was failing to take any action to prevent it. General Sefer Halilović admitted that ARBiH helicopters had flown in violation of the no-fly zone and that he had personally dispatched eight helicopters with ammunition for the 28th Division.

Between 1,000 and 2,000 soldiers from three of the VRS Drina Corps Brigades were deployed around the enclave, equipped with tanks, armoured vehicles, artillery and mortars. The 28th Mountain Division of the Army of the Republic of Bosnia and Herzegovina (ARBiH) remaining in the enclave was neither well organised nor equipped, and lacked a firm command structure and communications system. Some of its soldiers carried old hunting rifles or no weapons at all, and few had proper uniforms.

United Nations failure to demilitarise Srebrenica 
A Security Council mission led by Diego Arria arrived in Srebrenica on 25 April 1993 and, in their subsequent report to the UN, condemned the Serbs for perpetrating "a slow-motion process of genocide." The mission then stated that "Serb forces must withdraw to points from which they cannot attack, harass or terrorise the town. UNPROFOR should be in a position to determine the related parameters. The mission believes, as does UNPROFOR, that the actual 4.5 km (3 mi) by 0.5 km (530 yd) decided as a safe area should be greatly expanded." Specific instructions from United Nations Headquarters in New York stated that UNPROFOR should not be too zealous in searching for Bosniak weapons and, later, that the Serbs should withdraw their heavy weapons before the Bosniaks gave up their weapons. The Serbs never did withdraw their heavy weapons.

Multiple attempts to demilitarise the ARBiH and force the withdrawal of the VRS proved futile. The ARBiH hid the majority of their heavy weapons, modern equipment and ammunition in the surrounding forest and only handed over disused and old weaponry. On the other hand, given the failure to disarm the ARBiH, the VRS refused to withdraw from the front lines given the intelligence they had regarding hidden weaponry.

In March 1994, UNPROFOR sent 600 Royal Dutch Army soldiers ("Dutchbat") to replace the Canadian troops. By March 1995, Serb forces controlled all territory surrounding Srebrenica, preventing even UN access to the supply road. Humanitarian aid decreased significantly and living conditions in Srebrenica quickly deteriorated. UNPROFOR presence prevented all-out assault on the safe area, although occasional skirmishes and mortar attacks continued. The Dutchbat alerted UNPROFOR command to the dire conditions in Srebrenica, but UNPROFOR declined to send humanitarian relief or military support.

Early 1995: the situation in the Srebrenica "safe area" deteriorates 
By early 1995, fewer and fewer supply convoys were making it through to the enclave. The situation in Srebrenica and in other enclaves had deteriorated into lawless violence as prostitution among young Muslim girls, theft and black marketeering proliferated. The already meager resources of the civilian population dwindled further, and even the UN forces started running dangerously low on food, medicine, ammunition and fuel, eventually being forced to start patrolling the enclave on foot. Dutch soldiers who left the area on leave were not allowed to return, and their number dropped from 600 to 400 men. In March and April, the Dutch soldiers noticed a build-up of Serb forces near two of the observation posts, "OP Romeo" and "OP Quebec".

In March 1995, Radovan Karadžić, President of the Republika Srpska (RS), despite pressure from the international community to end the war and ongoing efforts to negotiate a peace agreement, issued a directive to the VRS concerning the long-term strategy of the VRS forces in the enclave. The directive, known as "Directive 7", specified that the VRS was to:

By mid-1995, the humanitarian situation of the Bosniak civilians and military personnel in the enclave was catastrophic. In May, following orders, Orić and his staff left the enclave by helicopter to Tuzla, leaving senior officers in command of the 28th Division. In late June and early July, the 28th Division issued a series of reports including urgent pleas for the humanitarian corridor to the enclave to be reopened. When this failed, Bosniak civilians began dying from starvation. On Friday, 7 July the mayor of Srebrenica reported that eight residents had died of starvation.

On 4 June 1995, UNPROFOR commander Bernard Janvier, a Frenchman, secretly met with Ratko Mladić to obtain the release of hostages, many of whom were French. Mladić demanded of Janvier that there would be no more air strikes.

In the weeks leading up to the assault on Srebrenica by the VRS, ARBiH forces were ordered to carry out diversion and disruption attacks on the VRS by the high command. On one particular occasion on the evening of 25–26 June, ARBiH forces attacked VRS units on the Sarajevo-Zvornik, road inflicting high casualties and looting VRS stockpiles.

6–11 July 1995: Serb takeover of Srebrenica 

The Serb offensive against Srebrenica began in earnest on 6 July 1995. The VRS, with 2,000 soldiers, were outnumbered by the defenders and did not expect the assault to be an easy victory. In the following days, the five UNPROFOR observation posts in the southern part of the enclave fell one by one in the face of the Bosnian Serb advance. Some of the Dutch soldiers retreated into the enclave after their posts were attacked, but the crews of the other observation posts surrendered into Serb custody. Simultaneously, the defending Bosnian forces numbering 6,000 came under heavy fire and were pushed back towards the town. Once the southern perimeter began to collapse, about 4,000 Bosniak residents who had been living in a Swedish housing complex for refugees nearby fled north into the town of Srebrenica. Dutch soldiers reported that the advancing Serbs were "cleansing" the houses in the southern part of the enclave.

On 8 July, a Dutch YPR-765 armoured vehicle took fire from the Serbs and withdrew. A group of Bosniaks demanded that the armoured vehicle stay to defend them, and established a makeshift barricade to prevent its retreat. As the armoured vehicle continued to withdraw, a Bosniak farmer who was manning the barricade threw a hand grenade onto it and subsequently killed Dutch soldier Raviv van Renssen. Late on 9 July 1995, emboldened by early successes and little resistance from the largely demilitarised Bosniaks as well as the absence of any significant reaction from the international community, President Karadžić issued a new order authorising the 1,500-strong VRS Drina Corps to capture the town of Srebrenica.

The following morning, 10 July 1995, Lieutenant Colonel Karremans made urgent requests for air support from North Atlantic Treaty Organization (NATO) to defend Srebrenica as crowds filled the streets, some of whom carried weapons. VRS tanks were approaching the town, and NATO airstrikes on these began on the afternoon of 11 July 1995. NATO bombers attempted to attack VRS artillery locations outside the town, but poor visibility forced NATO to cancel this operation. Further NATO air attacks were cancelled after VRS threats to bomb the UN's Potočari compound, to kill Dutch and French military hostages and to attack surrounding locations where 20,000 to 30,000 civilian refugees were situated. 30 Dutchbat were taken hostage by Mladic's troops.

Late in the afternoon of 11 July, General Mladić, accompanied by General Živanović (then-Commander of the Drina Corps), General Krstić (then-Deputy Commander and Chief of Staff of the Drina Corps) and other VRS officers, took a triumphant walk through the deserted streets of the town of Srebrenica.

In the evening, Lieutenant Colonel Karremans was filmed drinking a toast with General Mladić during the bungled negotiations on the fate of the civilian population grouped in Potočari.

Massacre 
The two highest ranking Serb politicians from Bosnia and Herzegovina, Karadžić and Momčilo Krajišnik, both indicted for genocide, were warned by VRS commander Mladić (found guilty of genocide at a UN tribunal in 2017) that their plans could not be realized without committing genocide. Mladić said:

Increasing concentration of refugees in Potočari 

By the evening of 11 July 1995, approximately 20,000 to 25,000 Bosniak refugees from Srebrenica were gathered in Potočari, seeking protection within the UNPROFOR Dutchbat headquarters. Several thousand had pressed inside the compound itself, while the rest were spread throughout the neighbouring factories and fields. Although the vast majority were women, children, elderly or disabled, 63 witnesses estimated that there were at least 300 men inside the perimeter of the UNPROFOR compound and between 600 and 900 men in the crowd outside.

Conditions in Potočari included "little food or water available" and sweltering heat. One UNPROFOR Dutchbat officer described the scene as follows:

On 12 July, the United Nations Security Council, in Resolution 1004, expressed concern at the humanitarian situation in Potočari, which also condemned the offensive by Bosnian Serb forces and demanded immediate withdrawal.

On 13 July, the Dutch forces expelled five Bosniak refugees from the United Nations compound despite knowing that men outside the compound were being killed and abused.

Crimes committed in Potočari 

On 12 July 1995, as the day wore on, the refugees in the compound could see VRS members setting houses and haystacks on fire. Throughout the afternoon, Serb soldiers mingled in the crowd and summary executions of men occurred. In the late morning of 12 July a witness saw a pile of 20 to 30 bodies heaped up behind the Transport Building in Potočari, alongside a tractor-like machine. Another testified that he saw a soldier slay a child with a knife in the middle of a crowd of expellees. He also said that he saw Serb soldiers execute more than a hundred Bosniak Muslim men in the area behind the Zinc Factory and then load their bodies onto a truck, although the number and nature of the murders stand in contrast to other evidence in the Trial Record, which indicates that the killings in Potočari were sporadic in nature. Soldiers were picking people out of the crowd and taking them away. A witness recounted how three brothers—one merely a child and the others in their teens—were taken out in the night. When the boys' mother went looking for them, she found them stark naked and with their throats slit. That night, a Dutchbat medical orderly witnessed two Serb soldiers raping a young woman.

One survivor described the murder of a baby and the rape of women occurring in the close vicinity of Dutch UN peacekeepers who did nothing to prevent it. According to the survivor, a Serb told a mother to make her child stop crying, and when it continued to cry he took it and slit its throat, after which he laughed. Stories about rapes and killings spread through the crowd and the terror in the camp escalated. Several individuals were so terrified that they committed suicide by hanging themselves.

One of the survivors, Zarfa Turković, described the horrors of rapes as follows: "Two [Serb soldiers] took her legs and raised them up in the air, while the third began raping her. Four of them were taking turns on her. People were silent, no one moved. She was screaming and yelling and begging them to stop. They put a rag into her mouth and then we just heard silent sobs...."

Separation and murder of Bosniak men and boys in Potočari 
From the morning of 12 July, Serb forces began gathering men and boys from the refugee population in Potočari and holding them in separate locations, and as the refugees began boarding the buses headed north towards Bosniak-held territory, Serb soldiers separated out men of military age who were trying to clamber aboard. Occasionally, younger and older men were stopped as well (some as young as 14 or 15).
These men were taken to a building in Potočari referred to as the "White House". As early as the evening of 12 July 1995, Major Franken of the Dutchbat heard that no men were arriving with the women and children at their destination in Kladanj. At this time, the UNHCR Director of Operations, Peter Walsh, was dispatched to Srebrenica by the UNHCR Chief of Mission, Damaso Feci, to evaluate what emergency aid could be provided rapidly. Peter Walsh and his team arrived at Gostilj, just outside Srebrenica, in the early afternoon only to be turned away by VRS forces. Despite claiming freedom of movement rights, the UNHCR team was not allowed to proceed and was forced to head back north to Bijelina. Throughout this time, Peter Walsh relayed reports back to UNHCR in Zagreb about the unfolding situation including witnessing the enforced movement and abuse of Muslim men and boys and the sound of summary executions taking place.

On 13 July 1995, Dutchbat troops witnessed definite signs that the Serb soldiers were murdering some of the Bosniak men who had been separated. For example, Corporal Vaasen saw two soldiers take a man behind the "White House", heard a shot and saw the two soldiers reappear alone. Another Dutchbat officer saw Serb soldiers murder an unarmed man with a single gunshot to the head and heard gunshots 20–40 times an hour throughout the afternoon. When the Dutchbat soldiers told Colonel Joseph Kingori, a United Nations Military Observer (UNMO) in the Srebrenica area, that men were being taken behind the "White House" and not coming back, Colonel Kingori went to investigate. He heard gunshots as he approached but was stopped by Serb soldiers before he could find out what was going on.

Some of the executions were carried out at night under arc lights, and bulldozers then pushed the bodies into mass graves. According to evidence collected from Bosniaks by French policeman Jean-René Ruez, some were buried alive; he also heard testimony describing Serb forces killing and torturing refugees at will, streets littered with corpses, people committing suicide to avoid having their noses, lips and ears chopped off, and adults being forced to watch the soldiers kill their children.

Rape and abuse of civilians 
Thousands of women and girls suffered rape and sexual abuse and other forms of torture. According to the testimony of Zumra Šehomerovic:

Testimony of Ramiza Gurdić:

Testimony of Kada Hotić:

That night, a DutchBat medical orderly came across two Serb soldiers raping a young woman:

Deportation of women 
As a result of exhaustive UN negotiations with Serb troops, around 25,000 Srebrenica women were forcibly transferred to Bosniak-controlled territory.

Some buses apparently never reached safety. According to a witness account given by Kadir Habibović, who hid himself on one of the first buses from the base in Potočari to Kladanj, he saw at least one vehicle full of Bosniak women being driven away from Bosnian government-held territory.

Column of Bosniak men 

On the evening of 11 July 1995, word spread through the Bosniak community that able-bodied men should take to the woods, form a column together with members of the ARBiH's 28th Division and attempt a breakthrough towards Bosnian government-held territory in the north. The men believed they stood a better chance of surviving by trying to escape than if they let themselves fall into Serb hands.

Around 10 pm on 11 July the Division command, together with the municipal authorities, took the decision, on their own initiative, to form a column and leave the safe area in an attempt to reach government-controlled territory around Tuzla.
Dehydration made finding drinking water a major problem, along with lack of sleep and physical exhaustion—many were exhausted before setting out. There was little cohesion or sense of common purpose in the column. Along the way, the column was shelled and ambushed. In severe mental distress, some of the refugees killed themselves. Others were induced to surrender. Survivors claimed they were attacked with a chemical agent that caused hallucinations, disorientation and strange behaviour. Infiltrators in civilian clothing confused, attacked and killed refugees, including the wounded. Many of those taken prisoner were killed on the spot. Others were collected together before being taken to remote locations for mass execution.

The attacks on the column broke it up into smaller segments. Only about one third of the men succeeded in crossing the asphalt road between Konjević Polje and Nova Kasaba. It was this group that eventually crossed Bosnian Serb lines to reach Bosnian government territory on and after 16 July. The vast majority of the victims of the massacre were members of the column who failed to complete the perilous journey.

Other groups 
A second, smaller group of refugees (estimated at between 700 and 800) attempted to escape into Serbia via Mount Kvarac via Bratunac, or across the river Drina and via Bajina Bašta. It is not known how many were intercepted, arrested and killed on the way. A third group headed for Žepa, possibly having first tried to reach Tuzla. The estimates of the numbers involved vary widely, from 300 to around 850. In addition, small pockets of resistance apparently remained behind and engaged Serb forces.

Tuzla column departs 
Almost all the 28th Division, 5,500 to 6,000 soldiers, not all armed, gathered in the village of Šušnjari, in the hills north of the town of Srebrenica, along with about 7,000 civilians. They included a very small number of women, not more than ten. Others assembled in the nearby village of Jaglići.

At around midnight on 11 July 1995, the column started moving along the axis between Konjević Polje and Bratunac. The main column was preceded by a reconnaissance party of four scouts, approximately five kilometers ahead. Members of the column walked one behind the other, following the paper trail laid down by a de-mining unit.

The column was led by a group of 50–100 of the best soldiers from each brigade, carrying the best available equipment. Elements of the 284th Brigade were followed by the 280th Brigade, with them the Chief of Staff Ramiz Bećirović. Civilians accompanied by other soldiers followed, and at the back was the independent battalion which was part of the 28th Division. The command and armed men were at the front of the column, following the deminer unit. Others in the column included the political leaders of the enclave, medical staff of the local hospital and the families of prominent persons in Srebrenica. A small number of women, children and elderly travelled with the column in the woods. The column was between 12 and 15 kilometers long, about two and a half hours separating head from tail.

The breakout from the enclave and the attempt to reach Tuzla came as a surprise to the VRS and caused considerable confusion, as the VRS had expected the men to go to Potočari. Serb general Milan Gvero in a briefing referred to members of the column as "hardened and violent criminals who will stop at nothing to prevent being taken prisoner and to enable their escape into Bosnian territory". The Drina Corps and the various brigades were ordered by the VRS Main Staff to assign all available manpower to the task of finding any Muslim groups observed, preventing them from crossing into Muslim territory, taking them prisoner and holding them in buildings that could be secured by small forces.

Ambush at Kamenica Hill 
During the night, poor visibility, fear of mines and panic induced by artillery fire split the column in two.

On the afternoon of 12 July, the front section emerged from the woods and crossed the asphalt road from Konjević Polje and Nova Kasaba. Around 18.00 hours, the VRS Army located the main part of the column still in the hilly area around Kamenica (outside the village of Pobuđe). Around 20:00 hours this part of the column, led by the municipal authorities and the wounded, started descending Kamenica Hill towards the road. After a few dozen men had crossed, soldiers of the VRS Army arrived from the direction of Kravica in trucks and armoured vehicles including a white vehicle with UNPROFOR symbols, calling out for Bosniaks over the loudspeaker to surrender.

It was around this time that yellow smoke was observed, followed by observations of strange behaviour, including suicides, hallucinations and members of the column attacking one another. Numerous survivors interviewed by Human Rights Watch claimed they were attacked with a chemical agent that caused hallucinations and disorientation. (General Zdravko Tolimir was an advocate of the use of chemical weapons against the ArBiH.)

Heavy shooting and shelling began, which continued into the night. The armed members of the column returned fire and all scattered. Survivors describe a group of at least 1,000 engaged at close range by small arms. Hundreds appear to have been killed as they fled the open area and some were said to have killed themselves to escape capture.

VRS Army and Ministry of Interior personnel persuaded members of the column to surrender by promising them protection and safe transportation towards Tuzla under UNPROFOR and Red Cross supervision. Appropriated UN and Red Cross equipment was used to deceive the refugees into believing the promises. Surrendering prisoners' personal belongings were confiscated and some were executed on the spot.

The rear of the column lost contact with the front and panic broke out. Many people remained in the Kamenica Hill area for a number of days, unable to move on with the escape route blocked by Serb forces. Thousands of Bosniaks surrendered or were captured. Some prisoners were ordered to summon friends and family members from the woods. There were reports of Serb forces using megaphones to call on the marchers to surrender, telling them that they would be exchanged for Serb soldiers held captive by Bosniak forces. It was at Kamenica that VRS personnel in civilian dress were reported to have infiltrated the column. Men from the rear of the column who survived this ordeal described it as a manhunt.

Sandići massacre 

Close to Sandići, on the main road from Bratunac to Konjević Polje, one witness describes the Serbs forcing a Bosniak man to call other Bosniaks down from the mountains. Some 200 to 300 men, including the witness' brother, followed his instructions and descended to meet the VRS, presumably expecting some exchange of prisoners would take place. The witness hid behind a tree to see what would happen next. He watched as the men were lined up in seven ranks, each some forty metres in length, with their hands behind their heads; they were then mowed down by machine gun fire.

A small number of women, children and elderly people who had been part of the column were allowed to join the buses evacuating the women and children out of Potočari. Among them was Alma Delimustafić, a soldier of the 28th Brigade; at this time, Delimustafić was in her civilian clothes and was released.

Trek to Mount Udrč 
The central section of the column managed to escape the shooting and reached Kamenica at about 11:00 hours and waited there for the wounded. Captain Ejub Golić and the Independent Battalion turned back towards Hajdučko Groblje to help the casualties. A number of survivors from the rear, who managed to escape crossed the asphalt roads to the north or the west of the area, had joined those in the central section of the column. The front third of the column, which had already left Kamenica Hill by the time the ambush occurred, headed for Mount Udrč; crossing the main asphalt road, they then forded the river Jadar. They reached the base of the mountain early on the morning of Thursday, 13 July and regrouped. At first, it was decided to send 300 ARBiH soldiers back in an attempt to break through the blockades. When reports came in that the central section of the column had nevertheless succeeded in crossing the road at Konjević Polje, this plan was abandoned. Approximately 1,000 additional men managed to reach Udrč that night.

Snagovo ambush 
From Udrč the marchers moved toward the River Drinjača and on to Mount Velja Glava, continuing through the night. Finding a Serb presence at Mount Velja Glava, where they arrived on Friday, 14 July, the column was forced to skirt the mountain and wait on its slopes before it was able to move on toward Liplje and Marčići. Arriving at Marčići in the evening of 14 July, the marchers were again ambushed near Snagovo by Serb forces equipped with anti-aircraft guns, artillery, and tanks.

According to Lieutenant Džemail Bećirović, the column managed to break through the ambush and, in so doing, captured a VRS officer, Major Zoran Janković—providing the Army of Bosnia and Herzegovina with a significant bargaining counter. This prompted an attempt at negotiating a cessation in the fighting, but negotiations with local Serb forces failed.

Approaching the frontline 
The evening of 15 July saw the first radio contact between the 2nd Corps and the 28th Division, established using a walkie-talkie captured from the VRS. After initial distrust on the part of the 28th Division, the Šabić brothers were able to identify each other as they stood on either side of the VRS lines. Early in the morning, the column crossed the asphalt road linking Zvornik with Caparde and headed in the direction of Planinci, leaving a unit of some 100 to 200 armed marchers behind to wait for stragglers. 

The column reached Križevići later that day, and remained there while an attempt was made to negotiate with local Serb forces for safe passage through the Serb lines into Bosnian government controlled territory. The members of the column were advised to stay where they were, and to allow the Serb forces time to arrange for safe passage. It soon became apparent, though, that the small Serb force deployed in the area was only trying to gain time to organise a further attack on the marchers. In the area of Marčići – Crni Vrh, the VRS armed forces deployed 500 soldiers and policemen in order to stop the split part of the column (about 2,500 people), which was moving from Glodi towards Marčići. 

At this point, the column's leaders decided to form several small groups of between 100 and 200 persons and send these to reconnoiter the way ahead. Early in the afternoon, the 2nd Corps and the 28th Division of the ARBiH met each other in the village of Potočani. The presidium of Srebrenica were the first to reach Bosnian terrain.

Breakthrough at Baljkovica 
The hillside at Baljkovica formed the last VRS line separating the column from Bosnian-held territory. The VRS cordon actually consisted of two lines, the first of which presented a front on the Tuzla side against the 2nd Corps and the other a front against the approaching 28th Division.

On the evening of 15 July a heavy hailstorm caused the Serb forces to take cover. The column's advance group took advantage of this to attack the Serb rear lines at Baljkovica. During the fighting, the main body of what remained of the column began to move from Krizevici. It reached the area of fighting at about 3 am on Sunday, 16 July.

At approximately 05.00 hours on 16 July, the 2nd Corps made its first attempt to break through the VRS cordon from the Bosnian side. The objective was to force a breakthrough close to the hamlets of Parlog and Resnik. They were joined by Naser Orić and a number of his men. 

Around 8 am on the morning of 16 July parts of the 28th Division, with the 2nd Corps of the RBiH Army from Tuzla providing artillery support, attacked and breached VRS Army lines. There was fierce fighting across the general area of Baljkovica.

Captured heavy arms including two Praga self-propelled anti-aircraft guns were fired at the Serb front line and the column finally succeeded in breaking through to Bosnian government controlled territory and linking up with BiH units at between 1 pm and 2 pm on 16 July.

Baljkovica corridor 
Following radio negotiations between the 2nd Corps and the Zvornik Brigade, the Zvornik Brigade Command, which had lost three lines of trenches, agreed to open a corridor to allow "evacuation" of the column in return for the release of captured policemen and soldiers. The Baljkovica corridor was open from 14.00 to 17.00 hours.

After the corridor was closed between 17.00 and 18.00 hours the Zvornik Brigade Command reported that around 5000 civilians, with probably "a certain number of soldiers" with them had been let through, but "all those who passed were unarmed".

Arrival at Tuzla 

By 4 August or thereabouts, the ArBiH determined that 3,175 members of the 28th Division had managed to get through to Tuzla. 2,628 members of the Division, soldiers and officers, were considered certain to have been killed. The approximate number of individual members of the column killed was estimated at between 8,300 and 9,722.

After the closure of the corridor 
Once the corridor had closed Serb forces recommenced hunting down parts of the column still in areas under their control. Around 2,000 refugees were reported to be hiding in the woods in the area of Pobuđe.

On 17 July 1995, "searching the terrain", the VRS Army captured a number of Bosniaks. Four children aged between 8 and 14 captured by the Bratunac Brigade were taken to the military barracks in Bratunac. Brigade Commander Blagojević suggested that the Drina Corps' press unit should record this testimony on video.

On 18 July, after a soldier was killed "trying to capture some persons during the search operation", the Zvornik Brigade Command issued an order to execute prisoners in its zone of
responsibility in order to avoid any risks associated with their capture. The order was presumed to have remained effective until it was countermanded on 21 July.

Impact on survivors
According to a 1998 qualitative study involving survivors of the column, many of the members of the column exhibited symptoms of hallucinations to varying degrees. On a number of occasions, Bosniak men began attacking one another in an apparent fear that the other member in the column was a Serb soldier. Members of the column also reported seeing people speaking incoherently, running towards VRS lines in a fit of rage and committing suicide using firearms and hand grenades. Although there was no evidence to suggest what exactly caused the behavior, the study suggested that fatigue and stress may have induced these symptoms.

Plan to execute the men of Srebrenica 

Although Serb forces had long been blamed for the massacre, it was not until June 2004—following the Srebrenica commission's preliminary report—that Serb officials acknowledged that their security forces planned and carried out the mass killing. A Serb commission's final report on the 1995 Srebrenica massacre acknowledged that the mass murder of the men and boys was planned. The commission found that more than 7,800 were killed.

A concerted effort was made to capture all Bosniak men of military age. In fact, those captured included many boys well below that age and elderly men several years above that age who remained in the enclave following the take-over of Srebrenica. These men and boys were targeted regardless of whether they chose to flee to Potočari or to join the Bosnian Muslim column. The operation to capture and detain the Bosnian Muslim men was well organised and comprehensive. The buses which transported the women and children were systematically searched for men.

Mass executions 

The vast amount of planning and high-level coordination invested in killing thousands of men in a few days is apparent from the scale and the methodical nature in which the executions were carried out.

The Army of Republika Srpska took the largest number of prisoners on 13 July, along the Bratunac-Konjević Polje road. It remains impossible to cite a precise figure, but witness statements describe the assembly points such as the field at Sandići, the agricultural warehouses in Kravica, the school in Konjević Polje, the football field in Nova Kasaba, the village of Lolići and the village school of Luke. Several thousand people were herded together in the field near Sandići and on the Nova Kasaba football pitch, where they were searched and put into smaller groups. In a video tape made by journalist Zoran Petrović, a Serb soldier states that at least 3,000 to 4,000 men had given themselves up on the road. By the late afternoon of 13 July, the total had risen to some 6,000 according to the intercepted radio communication; the following day, Major Franken of Dutchbat was given the same figure by Colonel Radislav Janković of the Serb army. Many of the prisoners had been seen in the locations described by passing convoys taking the women and children to Kladanj by bus, while various aerial photographs have since provided evidence to confirm this version of events.

One hour after the evacuation of the females from Potočari was completed, the Drina Corps staff diverted the buses to the areas in which the men were being held. Colonel Krsmanović, who on 12 July had arranged the buses for the evacuation, ordered the 700 men in Sandići to be collected, and the soldiers guarding them made them throw their possessions on a large heap and hand over anything of value. During the afternoon, the group in Sandići was visited by Mladić who told them that they would come to no harm, that they would be treated as prisoners of war, that they would be exchanged for other prisoners and that their families had been escorted to Tuzla in safety. Some of these men were placed on the transport to Bratunac and other locations, while some were marched on foot to the warehouses in Kravica. The men gathered on the soccer ground at Nova Kasaba were forced to hand over their personal belongings. They too received a personal visit from Mladić during the afternoon of 13 July; on this occasion, he announced that the Bosnian authorities in Tuzla did not want the men and that they were therefore to be taken to other locations. The men in Nova Kasaba were loaded onto buses and trucks and were taken to Bratunac or the other locations.

The Bosnian men who had been separated from the women, children and elderly in Potočari numbering approximately 1,000 were transported to Bratunac and subsequently joined by Bosnian men captured from the column. Almost without exception, the thousands of Bosnian prisoners captured, following the take-over of Srebrenica, were executed. Some were killed individually or in small groups by the soldiers who captured them and some were killed in the places where they were temporarily detained. Most, however, were killed in carefully orchestrated mass executions, commencing on 13 July 1995 in the region just north of Srebrenica.

The mass executions followed a well-established pattern. The men were first taken to empty schools or warehouses. After being detained there for some hours, they were loaded onto buses or trucks and taken to another site for execution. Usually, the execution fields were in isolated locations. The prisoners were unarmed and in many cases, steps had been taken to minimise resistance, such as blindfolding them, binding their wrists behind their backs with ligatures or removing their shoes. Once at the killing fields, the men were taken off the trucks in small groups, lined up and shot. Those who survived the initial round of shooting were individually shot with an extra round, though sometimes only after they had been left to suffer for a time.

The process of finding victim bodies in the Srebrenica region, often in mass graves, exhuming them and finally identifying them was relatively slow.

Morning of 13 July: Jadar River 
Prior to midday on 13 July, seventeen men were transported by bus a short distance to a spot on the banks of the Jadar River where they were lined up and shot. One man, after being hit in the hip by a bullet, jumped into the river and managed to escape.

Afternoon of 13 July: Cerska Valley 

The first large-scale mass executions began on the afternoon of 13 July 1995 in the valley of the River Cerska, to the west of Konjević Polje. One witness, hidden among trees, saw two or three trucks, followed by an armoured vehicle and an earthmoving machine proceeding towards Cerska. After that, he heard gunshots for half an hour and then saw the armoured vehicle going in the opposite direction, but not the earthmoving machine. Other witnesses report seeing a pool of blood alongside the road to Cerska that day. Muhamed Duraković, a UN translator, probably passed this execution site later that day. He reports seeing bodies tossed into a ditch alongside the road, with some men still alive.

Aerial photos and excavations later confirmed the presence of a mass grave near this location. Ammunition cartridges found at the scene reveal that the victims were lined up on one side of the road, whereupon their executioners shot from the other. The bodies—150 in number—were covered with earth where they lay. It could later be established that they had been killed by guns. All were men, between the ages of 14 and 50. All but three of the 150 were wearing civilian clothes. Many had their hands tied behind their backs. Nine could later be identified and were on the list of missing persons from Srebrenica.

Late afternoon of 13 July: Kravica 
Later on the afternoon of 13 July executions were also conducted in the largest of four warehouses (farm sheds) owned by the Agricultural Cooperative in Kravica. Between 1,000 and 1,500 men had been captured in fields near Sandići and detained in Sandići Meadow. They were brought to Kravica, either by bus or on foot, the distance being approximately one kilometer. A witness recalls seeing around 200 men, stripped to the waist and with their hands in the air, being forced to run in the direction of Kravica. An aerial photograph taken at 14:00 hours that afternoon shows two buses standing in front of the sheds.

At around 18:00 hours, when the men were all held in the warehouse, VRS soldiers threw in hand grenades and fired with various weapons, including rocket propelled grenades. The mass murder in Kravica seemed "well organised and involved a substantial amount of planning, requiring the participation of the Drina Corps Command."

Supposedly, there was more killing in and around Kravica and Sandići. Even before the murders in the warehouse, some 200 or 300 men were formed up in ranks near Sandići and then were executed en masse with concentrated machine guns. At Kravica, it seems that the local population had a hand in the killings. Some victims were mutilated and killed with knives. The bodies were taken to Bratunac or simply dumped in the river that runs alongside the road. One witness stated that this all took place on 14 July. There were three survivors of the mass murder in the farm sheds at Kravica.

Armed guards shot at the men who tried to climb out the windows to escape the massacre. When the shooting stopped, the shed was full of bodies. Another survivor, who was only slightly wounded, reports:

When this witness climbed out of a window, he was seen by a guard who shot at him. He pretended to be dead and managed to escape the following morning. The other witness quoted above spent the night under a heap of bodies; the next morning, he watched as the soldiers examined the corpses for signs of life. The few survivors were forced to sing Serbian songs, and were then shot. Once the final victim had been killed, an excavator was driven in to shunt the bodies out of the shed; the asphalt outside was then hosed down with water. In September 1996, however, it was still possible to find the evidence.

Analyses of hair, blood and explosives residue collected at the Kravica Warehouse provide strong evidence of the killings. Experts determined the presence of bullet strikes, explosives residue, bullets and shell cases, as well as human blood, bones and tissue adhering to the walls and floors of the building. Forensic evidence presented by the ICTY Prosecutor established a link between the executions in Kravica and the 'primary' mass grave known as Glogova 2, in which the remains of 139 people were found. In the 'secondary' grave known as Zeleni Jadar 5 there were 145 bodies, a number of which were charred. Pieces of brick and window frame which were found in the Glogova 1 grave that was opened later also established a link with Kravica. Here, the remains of 191 victims were found.

13–14 July: Tišća 

As the buses crowded with Bosnian women, children and elderly made their way from Potočari to Kladanj, they were stopped at Tišća village, searched, and the Bosnian men and boys found on board were removed from the bus. The evidence reveals a well-organised operation in Tišća.

From the checkpoint, an officer directed the soldier escorting the witness towards a nearby school where many other prisoners were being held. At the school, a soldier on a field telephone appeared to be transmitting and receiving orders. Sometime around midnight, the witness was loaded onto a truck with 22 other men with their hands tied behind their backs. At one point the truck stopped and a soldier on the scene said: "Not here. Take them up there, where they took people before." The truck reached another stopping point where the soldiers came around to the back of the truck and started shooting the prisoners. The survivor escaped by running away from the truck and hiding in a forest.

14 July: Grbavci and Orahovac 

A large group of the prisoners who had been held overnight in Bratunac were bussed in a convoy of 30 vehicles to the Grbavci school in Orahovac early in the morning of 14 July 1995. When they got there, the school gym was already half-filled with prisoners who had been arriving since the early morning hours and within a few hours, the building was completely full. Survivors estimated that there were 2,000 to 2,500 men there, some of them very young and some quite elderly, although the ICTY Prosecution suggested this may have been an over-estimation and that the number of prisoners at this site was probably closer to 1,000. Some prisoners were taken outside and killed. At some point, a witness recalled, General Mladić arrived and told the men: "Well, your government does not want you and I have to take care of you."

After being held in the gym for several hours, the men were led out in small groups to the execution fields that afternoon. Each prisoner was blindfolded and given a drink of water as he left the gym. The prisoners were then taken in trucks to the execution fields less than one kilometre away. The men were lined up and shot in the back; those who survived the initial shooting were killed with an extra shot. Two adjacent meadows were used; once one was full of bodies, the executioners moved to the other. While the executions were in progress, the survivors said, earth-moving equipment was digging the graves. A witness who survived the shootings by pretending to be dead, reported that General Mladić drove up in a red car and watched some of the executions.

The forensic evidence supports crucial aspects of the survivors' testimony. Both aerial photos show that the ground in Orahovac was disturbed between 5 and 27 July 1995 and again between 7 and 27 September 1995. Two primary mass graves were uncovered in the area and were named Lazete 1 and Lazete 2 by investigators.

The Lazete 1 gravesite was exhumed by the ICTY Prosecution between 13 July and 3 August 2000. All of the 130 individuals uncovered, for whom sex could be determined, were male; 138 blindfolds were uncovered in the grave. Identification material for 23 persons, listed as missing following the fall of Srebrenica, was located during the exhumations at this site. The gravesite Lazete 2 was partly exhumed by a joint team from the Office of the Prosecutor and Physicians for Human Rights between August and September 1996 and completed in 2000. All of the 243 victims associated with Lazete 2 were male and the experts determined that the vast majority died of gunshot injuries. In addition, 147 blindfolds were located.

Forensic analysis of soil/pollen samples, blindfolds, ligatures, shell cases and aerial images of creation/disturbance dates, further revealed that bodies from the Lazete 1 and 2 graves were removed and reburied at secondary graves named Hodžići Road 3, 4 and 5. Aerial images show that these secondary gravesites were created between 7 September and 2 October 1995 and all of them were exhumed in 1998.

14–15 July: Petkovići 

On 14 and 15 July 1995, another large group of prisoners numbering some 1,500 to 2,000 were taken from Bratunac to the school in Petkovići. The conditions under which these men were held at the Petkovići school were even worse than those in Grbavci. It was hot, overcrowded and there was no food or water. In the absence of anything else, some prisoners chose to drink their own urine. Every now and then, soldiers would enter the room and physically abuse prisoners, or would call them outside. A few of the prisoners contemplated an escape attempt, but others said it would be better to stay since the International Red Cross would be sure to monitor the situation and they could not all be killed.

The men were called outside in small groups. They were ordered to strip to the waist and to remove their shoes, whereupon their hands were tied behind their backs. During the night of 14 July, the men were taken by truck to the dam at Petkovići. Those who arrived later could see immediately what was happening there. A large number of bodies were strewn on the ground, their hands tied behind their backs. Small groups of five to ten men were taken out of the trucks, lined up and shot. Some begged for water but their pleas were ignored. A survivor described his feelings of fear combined with thirst thus:

After the soldiers had left, two survivors helped each other to untie their hands, and then crawled over the heap of bodies towards the woods, where they intended to hide. As dawn arrived, they could see the execution site where bulldozers were collecting the bodies. On the way to the execution site, one of the survivors had peeked out from under his blindfold and had seen that Mladić was also on his way to the scene.

Aerial photos confirmed that the earth near the Petkovići dam had been disturbed, and that it was disturbed yet again sometime between 7 and 27 September 1995. When the grave here was opened in April 1998, there seemed to be many bodies missing. Their removal had been accomplished with mechanical apparatus, causing considerable disturbance to the grave and its contents. At this time, the grave contained the remains of no more than 43 persons. Other bodies had been removed to a secondary grave, Liplje 2, prior to 2 October 1995. Here, the remains of at least 191 individuals were discovered.

14–16 July: Branjevo 
On 14 July 1995, more prisoners from Bratunac were bussed northward to a school in the village of Pilica, north of Zvornik. As at other detention facilities, there was no food or water and several men died in the school gym from heat and dehydration. The men were held at the Pilica school for two nights. On 16 July 1995, following a now familiar pattern, the men were called out of the school and loaded onto buses with their hands tied behind their backs. They were then driven to the Branjevo Military Farm, where groups of 10 were lined up and shot.

Dražen Erdemović—who confessed killing at least 70 Bosniaks—was a member of the VRS 10th Sabotage Detachment (a Main Staff subordinate unit) and participated in mass executions. Erdemović appeared as a prosecution witness and testified: "The men in front of us were ordered to turn their backs. When those men turned their backs to us, we shot at them. We were given orders to shoot."

On this point, one of the survivors recalls:

Erdemović said that all but one of the victims wore civilian clothes and that, except for one person who tried to escape, they offered no resistance before being shot. Sometimes the executioners were particularly cruel. When some of the soldiers recognised acquaintances from Srebrenica, they beat and humiliated them before killing them. Erdemović had to persuade his fellow soldiers to stop using a machine gun for the killings; while it mortally wounded the prisoners it did not cause death immediately and prolonged their suffering.
Between 1,000 and 1,200 men were killed in the course of that day at this execution site.

Aerial photographs, taken on 17 July 1995 of an area around the Branjevo Military Farm, show a large number of bodies lying in the field near the farm, as well as traces of the excavator that collected the bodies from the field.

Erdemović testified that, at around 15:00 hours on 16 July 1995 after he and his fellow soldiers from the 10th Sabotage Detachment had finished executing the prisoners at the Branjevo Military Farm, they were told that there was a group of 500 Bosnian prisoners from Srebrenica trying to break out of a nearby Dom Kultura club. Erdemović and the other members of his unit refused to carry out any more killings. They were then told to attend a meeting with a Lieutenant Colonel at a café in Pilica. Erdemović and his fellow-soldiers travelled to the café as requested and, as they waited, they could hear shots and grenades being detonated. The sounds lasted for approximately 15–20 minutes after which a soldier from Bratunac entered the café to inform those present that "everything was over".

There were no survivors to explain exactly what had happened in the Dom Kultura. The executions at the Dom Kultura were remarkable in that this was no remote spot but a location in the centre of town on the main road from Zvornik to Bijeljina. Over a year later, it was still possible to find physical evidence of this crime. As in Kravica, many traces of blood, hair and body tissue were found in the building, with cartridges and shells littered throughout the two storeys. It could also be established that explosives and machine guns had been used. Human remains and personal possessions were found under the stage, where blood had dripped down through the floorboards.

Two of the three survivors of the executions at the Branjevo Military Farm were arrested by local Bosnian Serb police on 25 July and sent to the prisoner of war compound at Batkovici. One had been a member of the group separated from the women in Potočari on 13 July. The prisoners who were taken to Batkovici survived the ordeal. and were later able to testify before the Tribunal.

Čančari Road 12 was the site of the re-interment of at least 174 bodies, moved here from the mass grave at the Branjevo Military Farm. Only 43 were complete sets of remains, most of which established that death had taken place as the result of rifle fire. Of the 313 various body parts found, 145 displayed gunshot wounds of a severity likely to prove fatal.

14–17 July: Kozluk 

The exact date of the executions at Kozluk is not known, although it can be narrowed down to the period of 14 to 17 July 1995. The most probable dates are 15 and 16 July, not least due to the geographic location of Kozluk, between Petkovići Dam and the Branjevo Military Farm. It therefore falls within the pattern of ever more northerly execution sites: Orahovac on 14 July, Petkovići Dam on 15 July, the Branjevo Military Farm and the Pilica Dom Kultura on 16 July. Another indication is that a Zvornik Brigade excavator spent eight hours in Kozluk on 16 July and a truck belonging to the same brigade made two journeys between Orahovac and Kozluk that day. A bulldozer is known to have been active in Kozluk on 18 and 19 July.

Among Bosnian refugees in Germany, there were rumors of executions in Kozluk, during which the five hundred or so prisoners were forced to sing Serbian songs as they were being transported to the execution site. Although no survivors have since come forward, investigations in 1999 led to the discovery of a mass grave near Kozluk. This proved to be the actual location of an execution as well, and lay alongside the Drina accessible only by driving through the barracks occupied by the Drina Wolves, a regular police unit of Republika Srpska. The grave was not dug specifically for the purpose: it had previously been a quarry and a landfill site. Investigators found many shards of green glass which the nearby 'Vitinka' bottling plant had dumped there. This facilitated the process of establishing links with the secondary graves along Čančari Road. The grave at Kozluk had been partly cleared some time prior to 27 September 1995 but no fewer than 340 bodies were found there nonetheless. In 237 cases, it was clear that they had died as the result of rifle fire: 83 by a single shot to the head, 76 by one shot through the torso region, 72 by multiple bullet wounds, five by wounds to the legs and one person by bullet wounds to the arm. The ages of the victims were between 8 and 85 years old. Some had been physically disabled, occasionally as the result of amputation. Many had clearly been tied and bound using strips of clothing or nylon thread.

Along the Čančari Road are twelve known mass graves, of which only two—Čančari Road 3 and 12—have been investigated in detail. Čančari Road 3 is known to have been a secondary grave linked to Kozluk, as shown by the glass fragments and labels from the Vitinka factory. The remains of 158 victims were found here, of which 35 bodies were still more or less intact and indicated that most had been killed by gunfire.

13–18 July: Bratunac-Konjević Polje road 
On 13 July, near Konjević Polje, Serb soldiers summarily executed hundreds of Bosniaks, including women and children.

The men who were found attempting to escape by the Bratunac-Konjević Polje road were told that the Geneva Convention would be observed if they gave themselves up. In Bratunac, men were told that there were Serbian personnel standing by to escort them to Zagreb for an exchange of prisoners. The visible presence of UN uniforms and UN vehicles, stolen from Dutchbat, were intended to contribute to the feeling of reassurance. On 17 to 18 July, Serb soldiers captured about 150–200 Bosnians in the vicinity of Konjevic Polje and summarily executed about one half of them.

18–19 July: Nezuk–Baljkovica frontline 
After the closure of the corridor at Baljkovica, several groups of stragglers nevertheless attempted to escape into Bosnian territory. Most were captured by VRS troops in the Nezuk–Baljkovica area and killed on the spot. In the vicinity of Nezuk, about 20 small groups surrendered to Bosnian Serb military forces. After the men surrendered, Bosnian Serb soldiers ordered them to line up and summarily executed them.

On 19 July, for example, a group of approximately 11 men was killed at Nezuk itself by units of the 16th Krajina Brigade, then operating under the direct command of the Zvornik Brigade. Reports reveal that a further 13 men, all ARBiH soldiers, were killed at Nezuk on 19 July. The report of the march to Tuzla includes the account of an ARBiH soldier who witnessed several executions carried out by police that day. He survived because 30 ARBiH soldiers were needed for an exchange of prisoners following the ARBiH's capture of a VRS officer at Baljkovica. The soldier was himself exchanged late 1995; at that time, there were still 229 men from Srebrenica in the Batkovici prisoner of war camp, including two men who had been taken prisoner in 1994.

At the same time, RS Ministry of the Interior forces conducting a search of the terrain from Kamenica as far as Snagovo killed eight Bosniaks. Around 200 Muslims armed with automatic and hunting rifles were reported to be hiding near the old road near Snagovo. During the morning, about 50 Bosniaks attacked the Zvornik Brigade line in the area of Pandurica, attempting to break through to Bosnian government territory. The Zvornik Public Security Centre planned to surround and destroy these two groups the following day using all available forces.

20–22 July: Meces area 
According to ICTY indictments of Radovan Karadžić and Ratko Mladić, on 20 to 21 July 1995 near the village of Meces, VRS personnel, using megaphones, urged Bosniak men who had fled Srebrenica to surrender and assured them that they would be safe. Approximately 350 men responded to these entreaties and surrendered. The soldiers then took approximately 150 of them, instructed them to dig their own graves and summarily executed them.

After the massacre 

During the days following the massacre, American spy planes overflew the area of Srebrenica, and took photos showing the ground in vast areas around the town had been removed, a sign of mass burials.

On 22 July, the commanding officer of the Zvornik Brigade, Lieutenant Colonel Vinko Pandurević, requested the Drina Corps to set up a committee to oversee the exchange of prisoners. He also asked for instructions where the prisoners of war his unit had already captured should be taken and to whom they should be handed over. Approximately 50 wounded captives were taken to the Bratunac hospital. Another group of prisoners was taken to the Batkovići camp (near Bijeljina), and these were mostly exchanged later. On 25 July, the Zvornik Brigade captured 25 more ARBiH soldiers who were taken directly to the camp at Batkovići, as were 34 ARBiH men captured the following day.

Zvornik Brigade reports up until 31 July continue to describe the search for refugees and the capture of small groups of Bosniaks.

A number of Bosniaks managed to cross over the River Drina into Serbia at Ljubovija and Bajina Bašta. 38 of them were returned to RS. Some were taken to the Batkovići camp, where they were exchanged. The fate of the majority has not been established. Some of those attempting to cross the Drina drowned.

By 17 July 1995, 201 Bosniak soldiers had arrived in Žepa, exhausted and many with light wounds. By 28 July another 500 had arrived in Žepa from Srebrenica.

After 19 July 1995, small Bosniak groups were hiding in the woods for days and months, trying to reach Tuzla. Numerous refugees found themselves cut off for some time in the area around Mount Udrc. They did not know what to do next or where to go; they managed to stay alive by eating vegetables and snails. The MT Udrc had become to a place for ambushing marchers, and the Bosnian Serbs swept through this area too, and according to one survivor they killed many people there.

Meanwhile, the VRS had commenced the process of clearing the bodies from around Srebrenica, Žepa, Kamenica and Snagovo. Work parties and municipal services were deployed to help. In Srebrenica, the refuse that had littered the streets since the departure of the people was collected and burnt, the town disinfected and deloused.

Wanderers 
Many people in the part of the column which had not succeeded in passing Kamenica did not wish to give themselves up and decided to turn back towards Žepa. Others remained where they were, splitting up into smaller groups of no more than ten. Some wandered around for months, either alone or groups of two, four or six men. Once Žepa had succumbed to the Serb pressure, they had to move on once more, either trying to reach Tuzla or crossing the River Drina into Serbia.

Zvornik 7

The most famous group of seven men wandered about in occupied territory for the entire winter. On 10 May 1996, after nine months on the run and over six months after the end of the war, they were discovered in a quarry by American IFOR soldiers. They immediately turned over to the patrol; they were searched and their weapons (two pistols and three hand grenades) were confiscated. The men said that they had been in hiding in the immediate vicinity of Srebrenica since the fall of the enclave. They did not look like soldiers and the Americans decided that this was a matter for the police. The operations officer of this American unit ordered that a Serb patrol should be escorted into the quarry whereupon the men would be handed over to the Serbs.

The prisoners said they were initially tortured after the transfer, but later were treated relatively well. In April 1997 the local court in Republika Srpska convicted the group, known as the Zvornik 7, for illegal possession of firearms and three of them for the murder of four Serbian woodsmen. When announcing the verdict the presenter of the TV of Republika Srpska described them as the group of Muslim terrorists from Srebrenica who last year massacred Serb civilians. The trial was widely condemned by the international community as "a flagrant miscarriage of justice", and the conviction was later quashed for 'procedural reasons' following pressure from the international community. In 1999, the three remaining defendants in the Zvornik 7 case were swapped for three Serbs serving 15 years each in a Bosnian prison.

Reburials in the secondary mass graves 

From approximately 1 August 1995 to 1 November 1995, there was an organised effort to remove the bodies from primary mass gravesites and transport them to secondary and tertiary gravesites. In the ICTY court case "Prosecutor v. Blagojević and Jokić", the trial chamber found that this reburial effort was an attempt to conceal evidence of the mass murders. The trial chamber found that the cover up operation was ordered by the VRS Main Staff and subsequently carried out by members of the Bratunac and Zvornik Brigades.

The cover-up operation has had a direct impact on the recovery and identification of the remains. The removal and reburial of the bodies have caused them to become dismembered and co-mingled, making it difficult for forensic investigators to positively identify the remains. For example, in one specific case, the remains of one person were found in two different locations, 30 km apart.
In addition to the ligatures and blindfolds found at the mass graves, the effort to hide the bodies has been seen as evidence of the organised nature of the massacres and the non-combatant status of the victims, since had the victims died in normal combat operations, there would be no need to hide their remains.

Greek Volunteers controversy 

According to Agence France Presse (AFP), a dozen Greek volunteers fought alongside the Serbs at Srebrenica. They were members of the Greek Volunteer Guard (ΕΕΦ), or GVG, a contingent of Greek paramilitaries formed at the request of Ratko Mladić as an integral part of the Drina Corps. The Greek volunteers were motivated by the desire to support their "Orthodox brothers" in battle. They raised the Greek flag at Srebrenica after the fall of the town at Mladić's request, to honour "the brave Greeks fighting on our side." Radovan Karadžić subsequently decorated four of them.

In 2005, Greek deputy  called for an investigation into the role of Greek volunteers in Srebrenica. The Greek Minister of Justice Anastasios Papaligouras commissioned an inquiry, which had still not reported .

In 2009,  announced that the volunteers were suing the writer Takis Michas for libel over allegations in his book Unholy Alliance, in which Michas described aspects of the Greek state's tacit support for the Serbs during the Bosnian War. Insisting that the volunteers had simply taken part in what he described as the "re-occupation" of the town, Vitalis acknowledged that he himself was present with senior Serb officers in "all operations" for Srebrenica's re-occupation by the Serbs. Michas said that the volunteers were treated like heroes and at no point did Greek justice contact them to investigate their knowledge of potential crimes to assist the work of the ICTY at The Hague.

Post-war developments

1995: Indictment of Radovan Karadžić and Ratko Mladić 

On 16 November 1995 Radovan Karadžić, "President of the Republika Srpska" and Ratko Mladić, Commander of the VRS, were indicted by the ICTY for their alleged direct responsibility for the war crimes committed in July 1995 against the Bosnian Muslim population of Srebrenica.

1999: UN Secretary-General's report 

In 1999, UN Secretary-General Kofi Annan submitted his report on the Fall of Srebrenica. In it, he acknowledged that the international community as a whole had to accept its share of responsibility for its response to the ethnic cleansing campaign that culminated in the murder of some 7,000 unarmed civilians from the town designated by the Security Council as a "safe area."

2002: Dutch government report 

The failure of Dutchbat to protect the Srebrenica enclave became a national trauma in the Netherlands and led to long-running discussions in the Netherlands. In 1996, the Dutch government asked the Netherlands Institute for War Documentation to conduct research into the events before, during and after the fall of Srebrenica. The resulting report was published in 2002—Srebrenica: a 'safe' area. It concluded that the Dutchbat mission was not well considered and well-nigh impossible. The NIOD report is cited often, however, the Institute for War and Peace Reporting labelled the report "controversial", as "the sheer abundance of information makes it possible for anyone to pluck from it whatever they need to make their point". One of the authors of the report claimed some of the sources were "unreliable", and were only used to support another author's argument.

As a result of the report, the Dutch government accepted partial political responsibility for the circumstances in which the massacre happened and the second cabinet of Wim Kok resigned in 2002.

2002: First Republika Srpska report

In September 2002, the Republika Srpska Office of Relations with the ICTY issued the "Report about Case Srebrenica". The document, authored by Darko Trifunović, was endorsed by many leading Bosnian Serb politicians. It concluded that 1,800 Bosnian Muslim soldiers died during fighting and a further 100 more died as a result of exhaustion. "The number of Muslim soldiers killed by Bosnian Serbs out of personal revenge or lack of knowledge of international law is probably about 100...It is important to uncover the names of the perpetrators in order to accurately and unequivocally establish whether or not these were isolated instances." The report also examined the mass graves, claiming that they were made for hygiene reasons, question the legitimacy of the missing person lists and undermine a key witness' mental health and military history. The International Crisis Group and the United Nations condemned the manipulation of their statements in this report.

2003: Srebrenica Genocide Memorial 

On 30 September 2003, former US President Bill Clinton officially opened the Srebrenica Genocide memorial to honour the victims of the genocide. The total cost of the project was around $5.8 million. "We must pay tribute to the innocent lives, many of them children who were snuffed out in what must be called genocidal madness", Clinton said.

2004: Second Republika Srpska report and official apology 

On 7 March 2003, the Human Rights Chamber for Bosnia and Herzegovina issued a decision which ordered the Republika Srpska, among other things, to conduct a full investigation into the Srebrenica events, and disclose the results at the latest on 7 September 2003. The Chamber had no coercive power to implement the decision, especially because it ceased to exist in late 2003. The RS then published two reports, on 3 June 2003 and 5 September 2003, which the Human Rights Chamber concluded did not fulfill the obligations of the RS. On 15 October 2003, The High Representative, Paddy Ashdown, lamented that "getting the truth from the [Bosnian Serb] government is like extracting rotten teeth". Ashdown did, however, welcome a recommendation in the September report to form an independent commission to investigate the Srebrenica events and issue a report within six months.

The Srebrenica commission, officially titled the Commission for Investigation of the Events in and around Srebrenica between 10 and 19 July 1995, was established in December 2003, and submitted its final report on 4 June 2004, and then an addendum on 15 October 2004 after delayed information was supplied. The report acknowledged that at least 7,000 men and boys were killed by Bosnian Serb forces, citing a provisional figure of 7,800.

In the report, because of "limited time" and to "maximize resources", the commission "accepted the historical background and the facts stated in the second-instance judgment 'Prosecutor vs. Radislav Krstić', when the ICTY convicted the accused for 'assisting and supporting genocide' committed in Srebrenica".

The findings of the commission remain generally disputed by Serb nationalists, who claim it was heavily pressured by the High Representative, given that an earlier RS government report which exonerated the Serbs was dismissed. Nevertheless, Dragan Čavić, the president of Republika Srpska, acknowledged in a televised address that Serb forces killed several thousand civilians in violation of the international law, and asserted that Srebrenica was a dark chapter in Serb history.

On 10 November 2004, the government of Republika Srpska issued an official apology. The statement came after a government review of the Srebrenica commission's report. "The report makes it clear that enormous crimes were committed in the area of Srebrenica in July 1995. The Bosnian Serb Government shares the pain of the families of the Srebrenica victims, is truly sorry and apologises for the tragedy", the Bosnian Serb government said.

2005: Republika Srpska Srebrenica Working Group 

After a request by Ashdown, the RS established a working group to implement the recommendations of the report by the Srebrenica commission. The group was to analyze the documentation in the report's confidential annexes and identify all the possible perpetrators who were officials in the institutions of the RS. A report on 1 April 2005 identified 892 such persons still employed by the RS, and the information was provided to the State Prosecutor of Bosnia and Herzegovina with the understanding that the names would not be made public until official proceedings had been opened.

On 4 October 2005, the working group said they had identified 25,083 people who were involved in the massacre, including 19,473 members of various Bosnian Serb armed forces that actively gave orders or directly took part in the massacre.

2005: Release of Scorpions massacre video 

On 1 June 2005, video evidence was introduced at the Slobodan Milošević trial to testify to the involvement of members of police units from Serbia in the Srebrenica massacre. The video, the only undestroyed copy of twenty and previously available for rental in the Serbian town of Šid, was obtained and submitted to the ICTY by Nataša Kandić, director of the Belgrade-based Humanitarian Law Center.

The video footage (starting about 2hr 35 min. into the proceedings) shows an Orthodox priest blessing several members of a Serbian unit known as the "Scorpions." Later these soldiers are shown visibly abusing civilians physically. They were later identified as four minors as young as 16 and two men in their early twenties. The footage then shows the execution of four of the civilians and shows them lying dead in the field. At this point the cameraman expresses disappointment that the camera's battery is almost out. The soldiers then ordered the two remaining captives to take the four dead bodies into a nearby barn, where they were also killed upon completing this task.

The video caused public outrage in Serbia. In the days following its showing, the Serbian government arrested some of the former soldiers identified on the video. The event was extensively covered by the newspaper Danas and radio and television station B92. Nura Alispahić, mother of the 16-year-old Azmir Alispahić, saw the execution of her son on television. She said that she was already aware of her son's death and said she had been told that his body was burned following the execution; his remains were among those buried in Potočari in 2003.

The executions took place on 16/17 July, in Trnovo, about 30 minutes from the Scorpions' base near Sarajevo.

On 10 April 2007, a special war crimes court in Belgrade convicted four former members of the Scorpions of war crimes, treating the killings as an isolated war crime unrelated to the Srebrenica genocide and ignoring the allegations that the Scorpions were acting under the authority of the Serbian Interior Ministry, MUP.

2005: U.S. Congress and other resolutions

On 27 June 2005, the United States House of Representatives passed a resolution (H. Res. 199 sponsored by Christopher Smith and Benjamin Cardin) commemorating the 10th anniversary of the Srebrenica genocide. The resolution was passed by an overwhelming majority of 370 to 1, the only one to vote no being Ron Paul, with 62 absent. The resolution states that:

On 6 July 2005, Missouri passed a resolution recognising the Srebrenica Genocide.

On 11 July 2005, St. Louis issued a proclamation declaring 11 July Srebrenica Remembrance Day there.

2005: Potočari Memorial bomb plot

On 6 July 2005, Bosnian Serb police found two powerful bombs at the memorial site just days ahead of a ceremony to mark the massacre's 10th anniversary, when 580 identified victims were to be buried during the ceremony and more than 50,000 people, including international politicians and diplomats, were expected to attend. The bombs would have caused widespread loss of life and injury had they exploded.

2005: UN Secretary-General's message to the 10th anniversary commemoration

In his message to the 10th anniversary commemoration at Potočari, the UN Secretary-General at the time, Kofi Annan, paid tribute to the victims of "a terrible crime – the worst on European soil since the Second World War", on a date "marked as a grim reminder of man's inhumanity to man". He said that the "first duty of the international community was to uncover and confront the full truth about what happened, a hard truth for those who serve the United Nations, because great nations failed to respond adequately. There should have been stronger military forces in place, and a stronger will to use them".

Annan added that while the blame lay first and foremost with those who had planned and carried out the massacre, the UN also bore its share of responsibility, having made serious errors of judgement, "rooted in a philosophy of impartiality and non-violence which, however admirable, was unsuited to the conflict in Bosnia; because of that the tragedy of Srebrenica would haunt the UN's history forever."

He called on all Bosnians to search for truth and reconciliation and committed the UN to helping the people of Bosnia and Herzegovina to "secure a peaceful, prosperous future among the family of nations."

2006: Discoveries of further mass graves 

By 2006, 42 mass graves have been uncovered around Srebrenica and the specialists believe there are 22 more mass graves. The victims identified number 2,070 while body parts in more than 7,000 bags still await identification. On 11 August 2006 over 1,000 body parts were exhumed from one of Srebrenica mass graves located in Kamenica.

2006: List of alleged participants published 

On 24 August 2006, the Sarajevo daily newspaper Oslobođenje started publishing a list of 892 Bosnian Serbs who had allegedly participated in the Srebrenica massacre and who were believed to be still employed by government and municipal institutions. The names of these individuals were listed among 28,000 Bosnian Serbs reported to have taken part in the massacre by the official Republika Srpska report on Srebrenica. The list had been withheld from publication with the report by the chief prosecutor of the Bosnian War Crimes Chamber, Marinko Jurčević who claimed that "publishing this information might jeopardise the ongoing investigations".

2006: Dutch Srebrenica insignia controversy 

In December 2006, the Dutch government awarded the Dutch UN peacekeepers who served in Srebrenica an insignia because they believed they "deserved recognition for their behaviour in difficult circumstances", also noting the limited mandate and the ill-equipped nature of the mission. However, survivors and relatives of the victims condemned the move, calling it a "humiliating decision" and responded with protest rallies in The Hague, Assen (where the ceremony took place) and Bosnia's capital Sarajevo.

2007: Arrest of Zdravko Tolimir 

On 31 May 2007, former Bosnian Serb general Zdravko Tolimir was apprehended by police from Serbia and the Bosnian Serb republic, turned over to NATO forces at the Banja Luka airport where he was read the ICTY indictment and formally arrested. On 1 June 2007 NATO forces conveyed him to Rotterdam where he was turned over to the ICTY in The Hague. , Tolimir was being tried by the ICTY on charges of genocide, conspiracy to commit genocide, extermination, persecution and forcible transfer. The indictment accuses Tolimir of participating in the "joint criminal enterprise to remove the Muslim population" from Srebrenica as well as the enclave of Zepa.

On 12 December 2012, Tolimir was convicted of genocide and sentenced to life imprisonment.

2008: Arrest of Radovan Karadžić 

Radovan Karadžić, with similar charges as Zdravko Tolimir, was arrested in Belgrade on 21 July 2008 (after 13 years on the run) and brought before Belgrade's War Crimes Court. He was transferred to the ICTY on 30 July 2008.  Karadžić was being tried at the ICTY on 11 charges of genocide, war crimes and crimes against humanity.

2009: EU Parliament resolution 

On 15 January 2009, the Parliament of the European Union voted with overwhelming majority of 556 votes in favour, 9 against and 22 abstentions on a resolution calling for the recognition of 11 July as a day for EU commemoration of the Srebrenica genocide. Bosnian Serb politicians rejected the resolution, stating that such a commemoration is unacceptable to the Republika Srpska.

2010 and 2013: Serbia's official apologies 
In late March 2010, Serbian Parliament passed a resolution condemning the Srebrenica massacre and apologizing for Serbia not doing more to prevent the tragedy. The motion was passed by a narrow margin with 127 out of 250 MPs voting in favor, with 173 legislators present during the vote. The Socialist Party of Serbia, formerly under Slobodan Milošević and now under new leadership, voted in favor of adopting the resolution. Opposition parties, in turn, expressed their discontent with the resolution claiming its text was "shameful" for Serbia, either claiming the wording was too strong or too weak. Some relatives of Bosniak victims were also unhappy with the apology, as it did not use the word 'genocide', but rather pointed at the Bosnian Genocide case ruling of the International Court of Justice. Serbian president, Boris Tadić, said that the declaration is the highest expression of patriotism and that it represents distancing from crimes. Sulejman Tihić, former Bosniak member of the Presidency of Bosnia and Herzegovina and the current President of the House of Peoples of Bosnia and Herzegovina stated that now Bosnia and Herzegovina must adopt a similar resolution condemning crimes against Serbs and Croats.

On 25 April 2013, President Tomislav Nikolić apologised for the massacre: "I kneel and ask for forgiveness for Serbia for the crime committed in Srebrenica. I apologise for the crimes committed by any individual in the name of our state and our people."

2010: Second Republika Srpska report revision 

On 21 April 2010, the government of Milorad Dodik, the prime minister of Republika Srpska, initiated a revision of the 2004 report saying that the numbers of killed were exaggerated and the report was manipulated by a former peace envoy. The Office of the High Representative responded by saying: "The Republika Srpska government should reconsider its conclusions and align itself with the facts and legal requirements and act accordingly, rather than inflicting emotional distress on the survivors, torture history and denigrate the public image of the country".

On 12 July 2010, at the 15th anniversary of the massacre, Milorad Dodik said that he acknowledged the killings that happened on the site, but did not regard what happened at Srebrenica as genocide.

2013: Supreme Court of the Netherlands judgement 

In a judgement dated 6 September 2013, Supreme Court of the Netherlands, the Netherlands as a state was found responsible for the death of the three of the murdered men. The court also found that it was the government of the Netherlands which had "effective control" over its troops. The rationale for finding that the Netherlands exercised "effective control" over Dutchbat was given as Art. 8 of the Articles on State Responsibility, which it defines as "factual control over specific conduct." The ruling also meant that relatives of these victims of the genocide are able to pursue the government of the Netherlands for compensation.

2015: Russia vetoes UN resolution 

On 8 July 2015, Russia vetoed a United Nations Security Council resolution that would have condemned the Srebrenica massacre as a genocide. The resolution was intended to mark the 20th anniversary of the killing of 8,000 Muslim men and boys. China, Nigeria, Angola and Venezuela abstained and the remaining 10 members of the council voted in favour. The veto was praised by Serbian President Tomislav Nikolić who said that Russia had "prevented an attempt of smearing the entire Serbian nation as genocidal" and proven itself as a true and honest friend.

DNA analysis 
 the International Commission on Missing Persons (ICMP) has identified 6,993 persons missing from the July 1995 fall of Srebrenica, mostly through analysing DNA profiles extracted from exhumed human remains and matching them to the DNA profiles obtained from blood samples donated by relatives of the missing. The organization estimates that the total number of deaths was just over 8,000.

Legal proceedings

International Criminal Tribunal for the former Yugoslavia 

Under Resolution 827 (1993) the UN Security Council established the International Criminal Tribunal for the Former Yugoslavia (ICTY) to try those responsible for violations of international humanitarian law, including genocide, on the territory of the former Yugoslavia

Two officers of the Army of the Republika Srpska have been convicted by the Tribunal for their involvement in the Srebrenica genocide, Radislav Krstić and Vidoje Blagojević. General Krstić, who led the assault on Srebrenica alongside Ratko Mladić, was convicted by the tribunal of aiding and abetting genocide and received a sentence of 35 years imprisonment. Colonel Blagojević received a sentence of 18 years imprisonment for crimes against humanity. Krstić was the first European to be convicted on a charge of genocide by an international tribunal since the Nuremberg trials, and only the third person ever to have been convicted by an international tribunal under the 1948 Convention on the Prevention and Punishment of the Crime of Genocide. The ICTY's final ruling in the case against Krstić judicially recognized the Srebrenica massacre as an act of genocide:

{{blockquote|By seeking to eliminate a part of the Bosnian Muslims, the Bosnian Serb forces committed genocide. They targeted for extinction the 40,000 Bosnian Muslims living in Srebrenica, a group which was emblematic of the Bosnian Muslims in general. They stripped all the male Muslim prisoners, military and civilian, elderly and young, of their personal belongings and identification, and deliberately and methodically killed them solely on the basis of their identity.}}

Slobodan Milošević was accused of genocide or complicity in genocide in territories within Bosnia and Herzegovina, including Srebrenica, but he died on 11 March 2006 during his ICTY trial and so no verdict was returned.

On 10 June 2010, seven senior Serb military and police officers, Vujadin Popović, Ljubiša Beara, Drago Nikolić, Ljubomir Borovčanin, Vinko Pandurević, Radivoje Miletić and Milan Gvero, were found guilty of various crimes ranging from genocide to murder and deportation. Popović and Beara were found guilty of genocide, extermination, murder, and persecution over the genocide, and were sentenced to life in prison. Nikolić was found guilty of aiding and abetting genocide, extermination, murder, and persecution and received 35 years in prison. Borovčanin was convicted of aiding and abetting extermination, murder, persecution, forcible transfer, murder as a crime against humanity and as a violation of the laws of customs of war, and was sentenced to 17 years in prison. Miletić was found guilty of murder by majority, persecution, and inhumane acts, specifically forcible transfer, and received 19 years in prison. Gvero was found guilty of persecution and inhumane acts and sentenced to five years in prison, but was acquitted of one count of murder and one count of deportation. Pandurević was found guilty of aiding and abetting murder, persecution and inhumane acts, but was acquitted of charges of genocide, extermination and deportation, and sentenced to 13 years in prison. On 10 September 2010, after the prosecution filed an appeal, Vujadin Popović, Ljubiša Beara, Drago Nikolić, Vinko Pandurević, Radivoje Miletić and Milan Gvero could face more charges or longer sentences.

In 2011, the former Chief of the General staff of the Yugoslav Army, Momčilo Perišić, was sentenced to 27 years in prison for aiding and abetting murder because he provided salaries, ammunition, staff and fuel to the VRS officers. The judges, however, ruled that Perišić did not have effective control over Mladić and other VRS officers involved in the crimes. According to the Trial Chamber, the evidence proved Perišić's inability to impose binding orders on Mladić.

On 31 May 2007, Zdravko Tolimir, a long time fugitive and a former general in the Army of the Republika Srpska indicted by the Prosecutor of the ICTY on genocide charges in the 1992–95 Bosnia war was arrested by Serbian and Bosnian police. Tolimir—"Chemical Zdravko"—is infamous for requesting the use of chemical weapons and proposing military strikes against refugees at Zepa. Ratko Mladić's deputy in charge of intelligence and security and a key commander at the time of Srebrenica, Tolimir is also believed to be one of the organisers of the support network protecting Mladić and helping him elude justice. Tolimir's trial began on 26 February 2010; he chose to represent himself.

Radovan Karadžić and Ratko Mladić were indicted by the ICTY for genocide and complicity in genocide in several municipalities within Bosnia and Herzegovina, including Srebrenica. Karadžić was captured in Serbia on 21 July 2008 and Mladić, on 26 May 2011. Karadžić declined to enter a plea at his second appearance before the war crimes tribunal on 29 August 2008, a formal plea of "not guilty" was then made on his behalf by the judges. Karadžić insisted on defending himself while at the same time set up a team of legal advisers. Karadžić and Mladić, were both tried on two counts of genocide and other war crimes committed in Srebrenica and also in other districts of Bosnia including Prijedor, Kljuc, Foča, and Zvornik. Karadžić and Mladić were charged, separately, with:Prosecutor's Marked-up Indictment, ICTY Case No. IT-09-92-I THE PROSECUTOR v RATKO MLADIC, 1 June 2011. Retrieved 7 June 2011
 Count 1: Genocide.
 Municipalities: Bratunac, Foča, Ključ, Kotor Varoš, Prijedor, Sanski Most, Vlasenica and Zvornik.
To date this count has been dropped from the Prosecutor v. Karadzic trial. To quote the ICTY chamber upon this decision: "The evidence, even if taken at its highest, does not reach a level which a reasonable trier of fact could conclude that genocide occurred in the municipalities of Bosnia and Herzegovina".
 Count 2: Genocide.
 Municipality: Srebrenica.
 Count 3: Persecutions on Political, Racial and Religious Grounds, a Crime Against Humanity.
 Municipalities: Banja Luka, Bijeljina, Bosanska Krupa, Bosanski Novi (now Novi Grad), Bratunac, Brčko, Foča, Hadžići, Ilidža, Kalinovik, Ključ, Kotor Varoš, Novo Sarajevo, Pale, Prijedor, Rogatica, Sanski Most, Sokolac, Trnovo, Vlasenica, Vogošća, Zvornik and Srebrenica.
 Count 4: Extermination, a Crime Against Humanity.
 Count 5: Murder, a Crime Against Humanity.
 Count 6: Murder, a Violation of the Laws or Customs of War.
 Count 7: Deportation, a Crime Against Humanity.
 Count 8: Inhumane Acts (forcible transfer), a Crime Against Humanity.
 Count 9: Acts of Violence the Primary Purpose of which is to Spread Terror among the Civilian Population, a Violation of the Laws or Customs of War.
 Count 10: Unlawful Attacks on Civilians, a Violation of the Laws or Customs of War.
 Count 11: Taking of Hostages, a Violation of the Laws or Customs of War.

 International Court of Justice 

In addition, the Srebrenica massacre was the core issue of the landmark court case Bosnian Genocide case at the International Court of Justice through which Bosnia and Herzegovina accused Serbia and Montenegro of genocide. The ICJ presented its judgement on 26 February 2007, which concurred with ICTY's recognition of the Srebrenica massacre as genocide. It cleared Serbia of direct involvement in genocide during the Bosnian war, but ruled that Belgrade did breach international law by failing to prevent the 1995 Srebrenica genocide, and for failing to try or transfer the persons accused of genocide to the ICTY, in order to comply with its obligations under Articles I and VI of the Genocide Convention, in particular in respect of General Ratko Mladić. Citing national security, Serbia obtained permission from the ICTY to keep parts of its military archives out of the public eye during its trial of Slobodan Milošević, which may have decisively affected the ICJ's judgement in the lawsuit brought against Serbia by Bosnia-Herzegovina, as the archives were hence not on the ICTY's public record – although the ICJ could have, but did not, subpoena the documents themselves. Chief prosecutor's office, OTP, rejects allegations that there was a deal with Belgrade to conceal documents from the ICJ Bosnia genocide case.

 National courts 

 Serbia See also above 2005 Release of Scorpions massacre videoOn 10 April 2007, a Serbian war crimes court sentenced four members of the Scorpions paramilitary group to a total of 58 years in prison for the execution of six Bosniaks during the Srebrenica massacre of July 1995.

 Bosnia and Herzegovina 

On 11 June 2007, the ICTY transferred Milorad Trbic (former Chief of Security of the Zvornik Brigade of the Army of Republika Srpska) to Sarajevo to stand trial for genocide for his actions in and around Srebrenica before the War Crimes Chamber (Section I for War Crimes of the Criminal Division of the Court of Bosnia and Herzegovina; henceforth: the Court). Milorad Trbic – "[Is] charged with Genocide pursuant to Article 171 of the Criminal Code of Bosnia and Herzegovina (CC BiH). … The trial commenced on 8 November 2007, and the Prosecutor is currently presenting his evidence."

The "Mitrović and others case ("Kravice")" was an important trial before the Court of Bosnia and Herzegovina. The accused "according to the indictment, in the period from 10 to 19 July 1995, as knowing participants in a joint criminal enterprise, the accused committed the criminal offence of genocide. This crime was allegedly committed as part of widespread and systematic attack against the Bosniak population inside the UN protected area of Srebrenica carried out by the Republika Srpska Army (RSA) and the RS Ministry of Interior, with a common plan to annihilate in part a group of Bosniak people." On 29 July 2008, after a two-year trial, the Court found seven men guilty of genocide for their role in the Srebrenica massacre including the deaths of 1000 Bosniak men in a single day. The court found that Bosniak men trying to escape from Srebrenica had been told they would be kept safe if they surrendered. Instead, they were transported to an agricultural co-operative in the village of Kravica, and later executed en masse.

On 20 April 2010, Croatia arrested Franc Kos, a member of the 10th commando detachment of the Army of the Republika Srpska, over genocide charges for the Srebrenica massacre. Bosnia and Herzegovina has an international warrant out for his arrest. He is currently awaiting trial.

On 29 April 2010, the United States extradited Marko Boškić on suspicions of having committed genocide. He later pleaded guilty.

On 18 January 2011, Israel arrested Aleksandar Cvetković, a veteran of the Bosnian Serb Army, after the Bosnian government filed an extradition request. Cvetković had moved to Israel in 2006 and secured citizenship through marriage to an Israeli. He was accused of having personally taken part in the executions of more than 800 men and boys, and initiated use of machine guns to speed up the killings. On 1 August 2011, a Jerusalem court approved Cvetković's extradition, and an appeal was denied in November 2012.

Božidar Kuvelja, a former Bosnian Serb policeman, was arrested in Čajniče, Bosnia and Herzegovina.

Guilty of genocide
 Milenko Trifunović (commander of the 3rd "Skelani" Platoon, part of the 2nd Special Police Šekovići Squad) – found guilty, sentenced to 42 years.
 Brano Džinić (special police force officer of the 2nd Special Police Šekovići Squad) – found guilty, sentenced to 42 years.
 Slobodan Jakovljević (special police force member of the 3rd "Skelani" Platoon) – found guilty, sentenced to 40 years.
 Branislav Medan (special police force member of the 3rd "Skelani" Platoon) – found guilty, sentenced to 40 years.
 Petar Mitrović (special police force member of the 3rd "Skelani" Platoon) – found guilty, sentenced to 38 years.
 Aleksandar Radovanović (special police force members of the 3rd "Skelani" Platoon) – found guilty, sentenced to 42 years.
 Milorad Trbić (assistant commander for Security with the Zvornik Brigade of the Republika Srpska Army) found guilty on one count of genocide and sentenced to 30 years in jail.
 Radomir Vuković (special police force officer of the 2nd Special Police Šekovići Squad) – found guilty, sentenced to 31 years.
 Zoran Tomić (special police force officer of the 2nd Special Police Šekovići Squad) – found guilty, sentenced to 31 years.
 Marko Boškić (member of 10th Commando Squad of the Republika Srpska Army) – pleaded guilty, sentenced to 10 years.
 Radovan Karadžić – found guilty; on 24 March 2016 he was sentenced to 40 years imprisonment.

Guilty of aiding and abetting genocide
 Duško Jević (deputy commander of the interior ministry special police brigade and the commander of the Jahorina special police training center) – found guilty, sentenced to 35 years.
 Mendeljev Đurić (commander of Jahorina special police training center's first company) – found guilty, sentenced to 30 years.

Guilty of crimes against humanity and war crimes
 Stanko Kojić (member of the 10th Sabotage Unit of the Republika Srpska Army) – found guilty, sentenced to 43 years.
 Franc Kos (commander of the First Platoon of the 10th Sabotage Unit of the Republika Srpska Army) – found guilty, sentenced to 40 years.
 Zoran Goronja (member of the 10th Sabotage Unit of the Republika Srpska Army) – found guilty, sentenced to 40 years.
 Vlastimir Golijan (member of the 10th Sabotage Unit of the Republika Srpska Army) – plead guilty, sentenced to 19 years.
 Dragan Crnogorac (police officer) – found guilty, sentenced to 13 years.

Acquitted
 Velibor Maksimović (special police force members of the 3rd "Skelani" Platoon) – acquitted.
 Milovan Matić (member of the Republika Srpska Army) – acquitted.
 Teodor Pavelvić (member of the Republika Srpska Army) – acquitted.
 Miladin Stevanović (special police force members of the 3rd "Skelani" Platoon) – acquitted.
 Dragiša Živanović (special police force members of the 3rd "Skelani" Platoon) – acquitted.
 Miloš Stupar (commander of the 2nd Special Police Šekovići Squad) – found guilty, sentenced to 40 years., later acquitted.
 Neđo Ikonić
 Goran Marković

On trial
 Božidar Kuvelja
 Dejan Radojković

Indicted
 Nedeljko Milidragović
 Aleksa Golijanin

Awaiting extradition
 Aleksandar Cvetković

 Netherlands 

Survivors and victims' relatives have sought to establish the responsibility of the State of the Netherlands and the United Nations for what happened at Srebrenica in civil law actions brought before The Hague District Court in the Netherlands. In one case, 11 plaintiffs including the organisation "Mothers of the Enclaves of Srebrenica and Žepa", asked the court, to rule that the UN and the State of the Netherlands breached their obligation to prevent genocide, as laid down in the Genocide Convention and hold them jointly liable to pay compensation to the plaintiffs. On 10 July 2008, the court ruled that it had no jurisdiction against the UN, plaintiffs have appealed the judgement in relation to UN immunity.

They claimed that Dutch troops in the peacekeeping contingent responsible for security in the UN-protected zone allowed VRS troops to kill their relatives, Nuhanović's brother, father and mother and Mustafić. They argued that the Dutch Government had de facto operational command of the Dutch battalion in accordance with the Dutch Constitution (Article 97(2)), which grants the government superior command (oppergezag) over military forces.

On 10 September 2008, the district court dismissed these claims and held that the State could not be held responsible because the Dutchbat peacekeepers were operating in Bosnia under a United Nations mandate and operational command and control over the troops had been transferred to the UN command. On 5 July 2011, the court of appeal reversed this decision and held that the State was responsible for, and indeed actively coordinated, the evacuation once Srebrenica fell, and therefore was responsible for the decision to dismiss Nuhanović's brother and Mustafić from the Dutchbat compound. The court further held that this decision was wrong, because the Dutch soldiers should have known that they were in great danger of being tortured or killed. Both claimants are therefore eligible for compensation.

On 6 September 2013, the Supreme Court dismissed a Government appeal, a judgment that the Government accepted. On 16 July 2014, a Dutch court held the Netherlands liable for the killings of more than 300 Bosniaks at Srebrenica; the same court ruled that the Netherlands was not liable for the other deaths in Srebrenica. The decision was upheld by The Hague Appeals Court on 27 June 2017. On 19 July 2019 the Dutch Supreme court ruled the Dutch state was liable for 10% for the 300 Bosnian men expelled from the compound.

 Analyses 

 Role of Bosnian forces on the ground 
In response to the suggestion that the Bosniak forces in Srebrenica made no adequate attempt to defend the town, the Report of the Secretary-General pursuant to General Assembly resolution 53/35—The Fall of Srebrenica, delivered to the 54th session of the United Nations General Assembly on 15 November 1999 states:

 Disputed Serb casualties around Srebrenica 
It is agreed by all sides that Serbs suffered a number of casualties during military forays led by Naser Orić. The controversy over the nature and number of the casualties came to a head in 2005, the 10th anniversary of the massacre. According to Human Rights Watch, the ultra-nationalist Serbian Radical Party "launched an aggressive campaign to prove that Muslims had committed crimes against thousands of Serbs in the area" which "was intended to diminish the significance of the July 1995 crime." A press briefing by the ICTY Office of the Prosecutor (OTP) dated 6 July 2005 noted that the number of Serb deaths in the region alleged by the Serbian authorities had increased from 1,400 to 3,500, a figure the OTP stated "[does] not reflect the reality." The briefing cited previous accounts:
 The Republika Srpska's Commission for War Crimes gave the number of Serb victims in the municipalities of Bratunac, Srebrenica and Skelani as 995; 520 in Bratunac and 475 in Srebrenica.
 The Chronicle of Our Graves by Milivoje Ivanišević, president of the Belgrade Centre for Investigating Crimes Committed against the Serbs, estimates the number of people killed at around 1,200.
 For the Honourable Cross and Golden Freedom, a book published by the RS Ministry of Interior, referred to 641 Serb victims in the Bratunac-Srebrenica-Skelani region.

The accuracy of these numbers is challenged: the OTP noted that although Ivanišević's book estimated that around 1,200 Serbs were killed, personal details were only available for 624 victims. The validity of labeling some of the casualties as "victims" is also challenged: studies have found a significant majority of military casualties compared to civilian casualties. This is in line with the nature of the conflict—Serb casualties died in raids by Bosniak forces on outlying villages used as military outposts for attacks on Srebrenica (many of which had been ethnically cleansed of their Bosniak majority population in 1992). For example, the village of Kravica was attacked by Bosniak forces on Orthodox Christmas Day, 7 January 1993. Some Serb sources such as Ivanišević allege that the village's 353 inhabitants were "virtually completely destroyed". In fact, the VRS' own internal records state that 46 Serbs died in the Kravica attack: 35 soldiers and 11 civilians, while the ICTY Prosecutor's Office's investigation of casualties on 7 and 8 January in Kravica and the surrounding villages found that 43 people were killed, of whom 13 were obviously civilians. Nevertheless, the event continues to be cited by Serb sources as the key example of crimes committed by Bosniak forces around Srebrenica. As for the destruction and casualties in the villages of Kravica, Šiljković, Bjelovac, Fakovići and Sikirić, the judgement states that the prosecution failed to present convincing evidence that the Bosnian forces were responsible for them, because the Serb forces used artillery in the fighting in those villages. In the case of the village of Bjelovac, Serbs even used warplanes.

The most up-to-date analysis of Serb casualties in the region comes from the Sarajevo-based Research and Documentation Centre, a non-partisan institution with a multiethnic staff, whose data have been collected, processed, checked, compared and evaluated by international team of experts.Heil, Rebekah (23 June 2007). "Bosnia's "Book of the Dead"", Institute for War & Peace Reporting. Retrieved 31 July 2008. The RDC's extensive review of casualty data found that Serb casualties in the Bratunac municipality amounted to 119 civilians and 424 soldiers. It also established that although the 383 Serb victims buried in the Bratunac military cemetery are presented as casualties of ARBiH units from Srebrenica, 139 (more than one third of the total) had fought and died elsewhere in Bosnia and Herzegovina.

Serb sources maintain that casualties and losses during the period prior to the creation of the safe area gave rise to Serb demands for revenge against the Bosniaks based in Srebrenica. The ARBiH raids are presented as a key motivating factor for the July 1995 genocide. This view is echoed by international sources including the 2002 report commissioned by the Dutch government on events leading to the fall of Srebrenica (the NIOD report). In Balkan Genocides: Holocaust and Ethnic Cleansing in the Twentieth Century, scholar Paul Mojzes notes that a great deal of animosity towards the men of Srebrenica stems from the period of May 1992 to January 1993 where forces under Orić's leadership attacked and destroyed scores of Serbian villages. Evidence indicated that Serbs had been tortured and mutilated and others were burned alive when their houses were torched.

The efforts to explain the Srebrenica massacre as motivated by revenge have been dismissed as bad faith attempts to justify the genocide. The ICTY Outreach Programme notes that the claim that Bosnian Serb forces killed the prisoners from Srebrenica in revenge for crimes committed by Bosnian Muslim forces against Serbs in the villages around Srebrenica provides no defence under international law and soldiers, certainly experienced officers, would be aware of the fact. To offer revenge as a justification for crimes is to attack the rule of law, and civilization itself, and nor does revenge provide moral justification for killing people simply because they share the same ethnicity as others who perpetrated crimes. The methodical planning and mobilization of the substantial resources involved required orders to be given at a high command level. The VRS had a plan to kill the Bosnian Muslim prisoners, as Bosnian Serb war criminal Dragan Obrenović confirmed.

The UN Secretary-General's report on the fall of Srebrenica said: "Even though this accusation is often repeated by international sources, there is no credible evidence to support it... The Serbs repeatedly exaggerated the extent of the raids out of Srebrenica as a pretext for the prosecution of a central war aim: to create a geographically contiguous and ethnically pure territory along the Drina."

Claim that the planning of mass executions in Srebrenica defies military logic
During Radislav Krstić's trial before the ICTY, the prosecution's military advisor, Richard Butler, pointed out that by carrying out a mass execution, the Serb Army deprived themselves of an extremely valuable bargaining counter. Butler suggested that they would have had far more to gain had they taken the men in Potočari as prisoners of war, under the supervision of the International Red Cross (ICRC) and the UN troops still in the area. It might then have been possible to enter into some sort of exchange deal or they might have been able to force political concessions. Based on this reasoning, the ensuing mass murder defied military explanation.

Dutchbat
On 13 July, "Dutchbat" expelled five Bosniak refugees from the United Nations compound. Later proceedings in Dutch courts have established legal liability of The Dutch State for the deaths of those expelled.

In 2013 the Dutch Supreme Court held the Netherlands responsible for the death of 3 Bosnian men who were expelled from a compound held by Dutchbat, on 13 July 1995.

On 19 July 2019. The Dutch Supreme court ruled that Dutchbat was not liable for the fall of Srebrenica and not liable for the massacre. The Dutch state was liable for 10% for the 300 Bosnian man expelled from the compound.

Claims of problems in the UNPROFOR chain of command above "Dutchbat"
Brigadier General, Hagrup Haukland was UNPROFOR's Commander of the sector in which the killings of the Srebrenica Massacre started on 11 July 1995. At this time he was on vacation. His subordinate, Colonel Charles Brantz phoned Haukland twice on 9 July 1995 to inform him about the crisis in Srebrenica. Confusion within his staff has been attributed in part to his being slow to return to his place of work, not arriving at Tuzla headquarters until 14 July.

Other problems within Haukland's staff included lack of cooperation between "the Dutch and the Pakistanis", according to Harald Valved (UNPROFOR military advisor). The 2002 report Srebrenica: a 'safe' area said that "The cadres consisted of clans of Norwegian, Pakistani and Dutch military that were incapable of adequate mutual cooperation."

In 2005 an unnamed officer on Haukland's multinational staff at Tuzla in 1995, disputed the claim by Haukland and the Norwegian Chief of Defence, Arne Solli, that the attack on Srebrenica was a surprise. The officer said "We knew early on that the Serbs were amassing their forces around Srebrenica. At the end of June, Haukland informed the headquarters at Sarajevo again and again in regards to this".

In 2006 it was reported that Haukland regularly informed Sollie about the conditions within Haukland's sector, and when Haukland departed Bosnia on his vacation to Norway, they travelled on the same airplane.

The 2002 report Srebrenica: a 'safe' area, did not assign any blame to Haukland for the massacre.

 Claims and retraction by retired NATO SACLANT 
In March 2010, John Sheehan, NATO's Supreme Allied Commander Atlantic from 1994 to 1997, told a US Senate hearing that the Dutch had "declared a peace dividend and made a conscious effort to socialise their military – that includes the unionisation of their militaries, it includes open homosexuality", claiming that gay soldiers could result in events like Srebrenica. He claimed that his opinion was shared by the leadership of the Dutch armed forces, mentioning the name "Hankman Berman", who Sheehan added, had told him that the presence of gay soldiers at Srebrenica had sapped morale and contributed to the disaster. General van den Breemen denied having said such a thing and called Sheehan's comments "total nonsense", Sheehan's remarks were also dismissed by the Dutch authorities as, "disgraceful" and "unworthy of a soldier". Sheehan apologised to Dutch military officials on 29 March 2010, withdrawing his comments and blaming instead "the rules of engagement...developed by a political system with conflicting priorities and an ambivalent understanding of how to use the military."

Criticism of the 1995 UN Special Representative for the former Yugoslavia
In 2005, Professor Arne Johan Vetlesen said "Thorvald Stoltenberg's co-responsibility in Srebrenica boils down to that he through three years as a top broker contributed to create a climate—diplomatic, politic and indirectly militarily—such that Mladic calculated correctly when he figured that he could do exactly what he wanted with Srebrenica's Muslim population".

The Dutch government report from 2002, Srebrenica: a 'safe' area, criticised the choice of Stoltenberg as a mediator.

 Denial 

Scepticism about the massacre has ranged from challenging the judicial recognition of the killings as an act of genocide to the denial of a massacre having taken place. The finding of genocide by the ICJ and the ICTY, has been disputed on evidential and theoretical grounds. The number of the dead has been questioned as has the nature of their deaths. It has been alleged that considerably fewer than 8,000 were killed and/or that most of those killed died in battle rather than by execution. It has been claimed that the interpretation of "genocide" is refuted by the survival of the women and children.

During the Bosnian war, Slobodan Milošević had effective control of most Serbian media. Following the end of the war, denial of Serbian responsibility for the killings in Srebrenica continued to be widespread among Serbians. Questions were raised regarding Srebrenica in the symposium Srebrenica 1995–2015: činjenice nedoumice, propaganda held by the Museum of Genocide Victims (Muzej žrtava genocida) and Strategic Culture Foundation (Fond strateške kulture) in Belgrade in 2017.

Sonja Biserko, president of the Helsinki Committee for Human Rights in Serbia, and Edina Bečirević, the Faculty of Criminalistics, Criminology and Security Studies of the University of Sarajevo have pointed to a culture of denial of the Srebrenica genocide in Serbian society, taking many forms and present in particular in political discourse, the media, the law and the educational system.
Examples

 Gallery 

 See also 

 12 April 1993 Srebrenica shelling
 Androcide
 Bosnian genocide denial
 Command responsibility
 A Cry from the Grave Dubh (ar thitim Shrebenice, 11ú Iúil, 1995)
 The Enclave Genocides in history
 List of events named massacres
 "Nož, žica, Srebrenica"
 Overture Persecution of Muslims
 Propaganda during the Yugoslav Wars
 Quo Vadis, Aida? Serbian war crimes in the Yugoslav Wars
 Siege of Srebrenica
 Silvertown A Town Betrayed Trial of Radovan Karadžić
 Zaklopača massacre

 Notes 

 References 
 
 

Further reading

National institutions
 Staff. Committee on Conscience Balkans Section—U.S. Holocaust Memorial Museum
  Myth of Bratunac A blatant numbers game Sarajevo-based Research & Documentation Centre. Retrieved 16 March 2008.
 Srebrenica Genocide videos documented by the United States Holocaust Memorial Museum, compiled by SrebrenicaGenocide.org.

Academic articles
 Brunborg, H., Lyngstad, T.H. and Urdal, H. (2003): Accounting for genocide: How many were killed in Srebrenica? European Journal of Population, 19(3):229–248. 
 Honig, Jan Willem. "Strategy and genocide: Srebrenica as an analytical challenge." Southeast European and Black Sea Studies 7.3 (2007): 399–416.
 David MacDonald, (University of Otago). Globalizing the Holocaust: A Jewish ‘useable past’ in Serbian Nationalism (PDF) , PORTAL: Journal of Multidisciplinary International Studies Vol. 2, No. 2 July 2005 
 Miller, Paul B. "Contested memories: the Bosnian genocide in Serb and Muslim minds." Journal of Genocide Research 8.3 (2006): 311–324.
 Mulaj, Klejda. "Genocide and the ending of war: Meaning, remembrance and denial in Srebrenica, Bosnia." Crime, Law and Social Change 68.1–2 (2017): 123–143. online
 Jasmina Besirevic Regan, Genocide Studies Program: Former Yugoslavia Yale University. Retrieved 16 March 2008
 van der Wilt, Harmen. "Srebrenica: on joint criminal enterprise, aiding and abetting and command responsibility." Netherlands International Law Review 62.2 (2015): 229–241. online
 Ryngaert, Cedric, and Nico Schrijver. "Lessons learned from the Srebrenica massacre: from UN peacekeeping reform to legal responsibility." Netherlands international law review 62.2 (2015): 219–227. online
 Karčić, Hamza. "Remembering by resolution: the case of Srebrenica." Journal of Genocide Research 17.2 (2015): 201–210. 
 Heynders, Odile. "Speaking the Self, Narratives on Srebrenica." European Journal of Life Writing 3 (2014): 1–22. online
 Gibbs, David N. "How the Srebrenica massacre redefined US foreign policy." Class, Race and Corporate Power 3.2 (2015): 5.  online

Books
 Lara J. Nettelfield, Sarah E. Wagner, Srebrenica in the aftermath of genocide. New York : Cambridge University Press, 2014. , . 
 Adam Lebor, 2006. "Complicity with Evil": The United Nations in the Age of Modern Genocide. Yale University Press/ .
 Van Gennep, 1999. Srebrenica: Het Verhaal van de Overlevenden [Srebrenica: The Story of the Survivors]. Van Gennep, Amsterdam. . (translation of: Samrtno Srebrenicko Ijeto '95, Udruzenje gradana 'Zene Srebrenice', Tuzla, 1998).
 Nihad Halilbegović Bosniaks in Jasenovac Concentration Camp. 
 David Rohde. 1997. Endgame: The Betrayal and Fall of Srebrenica, Europe's Worst massacre Since World War II. WestviewPress. .
 Emir Suljagic (2005). Postcards from the Grave, Saqi Books, .
 Roy Gutman, "A witness to genocide", Prentice Hall & IBD, 1993, .
 Cigar Norman, Genocide in Bosnia: The Policy of "Ethnic Cleansing", Texas A & M University Press, 1995..
 Allen, Beverly. Rape Warfare: The Hidden Genocide in Bosnia-Herzegovina and Croatia. Minneapolis:University of Minnesota Press,1996..
 Thomas Cushman and Stjepan G. Mestrovic,This Time We Knew: Western Responses to Genocide in Bosnia'', New York University Press,1996,.
 The United Nations on the Srebrenica's pillar of shame de 104 Testimonies, Harfo-graf, d.o.o.Tuzla, 2007,.
 Bartrop. Paul R., Bosnian genocide: the essential reference guide. ABC-CLIO LLC, Santa Barbara, 2016 

Reports
 Annan, Kofi "Report of the Secretary-General pursuant to General Assembly resolution 53/35—The fall of Srebrenica", United Nations A/54/549 (15 November 1999)
 Blom, J.C.H. et al. (2002) Prologue NIOD Report: Srebrenica. Reconstruction, background, consequences and analyses of the fall of a Safe Area – The Dutch government's investigation of the massacre and of Dutch UN troops' role, April 2002 
 Centre for Interdisciplinary Postgraduate Studies /University of Sarajevo – War Crimes, Genocide and Memories: The Roots of Evil: I Want to Understand
 Ewa Tabeau, Conflict in Numbers: Casualties of the 1990s Wars in the Former Yugoslavia (1991–1999), published by the Helsinki Committee for Human Rights in Serbia
 ICTY Outreach Programme Facts About Srebrenica

News media
 Slavenka Drakulic Triumph of Evil, Eurozine, 12 February 2004
 SREBRENICA Genocide, DocsOnline, 2020                                                                                                                              
 Staff New Srebrenica Genocide Trial Begins in Sarajevo from Balkan Insight, 17 October 2012
 Udo Ludwig and Ansgar Mertin. A Toast to the Dead: Srebrenica Widows Sue U.N., Dutch Government—Der Spiegel, 4 July 2006.
 Murat Karaali. The secret killings grounds of Srebrenica, Turkish Daily News, 10 January 1998.
 Marlise Simons. Serbia's darkest pages hidden from genocide court, International Herald Tribune, 8 April 2007
 Staff. New Srebrenica mass grave found, BBC News, 11 November 2006
 Staff Tarik Samarah: Srebrenica Fabrika Agency. Retrieved 16 March 2008
 Staff Sense Tribunal, is a specialised project of Sense News Agency Sense based in International War Crimes Tribunal for the former Yugoslavia in The Hague. The focus of this project is regular coverage of the work of the ICTY, and the activities of ICJ (International Court of Justice) and ICC (International Criminal Court). Retrieved 16 March 2008

NGOs
 Adam Jones. Case Study: The Srebrenica Massacre, July 1995 Gendercide Watch, 1999–2002. Retrieved 16 March 2008
 Emir Suljagic Milosevic Linked to Srebrenica Massacre-Institute for War and Peace Reporting, from Institute for War & Peace Reporting, republished by the Global Policy Forum 18 June 2003
 Staff. The Association Women of Srebrenica. Retrieved 16 March 2008
 Staff. Chemical Warfare in Bosnia? The Strange Experiences of the Srebrenica Survivors, Human Rights Watch, Vol. 10, No.9 (D) November 1998
 The Advocacy Project, 2009 Peace Fellows Alison Sluiter and Kelsey Bristow blogs, in partnership with Bosnian Family (BOSFAM)

Other
 Yves Billy, Gilles Hertzog Documentary: Srebrenica, an Orchestrated Tragedy, www.documen.tv
 Frankti. Srebrenica:: Investigations, Reports, Books, Domovina Net. Retrieved 16 March 2008.
 Merdijana Sadović. Srebrenica Status Question Won't Go Away. Institute for War & Peace Reporting TU No 503, 25 May 2007. —Bosniak returnees to Srebrenica now hope international community will back demand for town to be separated from Republika Srpska
 Staff. Bosnian Genocide, genocid.org. Retrieved 16 March 2008.
 Staff. Srebrenica's Inferno, Srebrenica in photographs. Retrieved 16 March 2008.
 Partial list of child victims of the Srebrenica massacre

 
Bosnian genocide
Anti-Muslim violence in Europe
Responsibility to protect
Serbian war crimes in the Bosnian War
Genocidal massacres
Genocide
Serbian nationalism
Ethnic cleansing in Europe
Bosnia and Herzegovina–Serbia relations
Serbian nationalism in Bosnia and Herzegovina
Genocides in Europe
Persecution of Muslims
Massacres of Bosniaks
Filmed executions